

339001–339100 

|-bgcolor=#d6d6d6
| 339001 ||  || — || April 12, 2004 || Anderson Mesa || LONEOS || EUP || align=right | 3.8 km || 
|-id=002 bgcolor=#fefefe
| 339002 ||  || — || April 14, 2004 || Kitt Peak || Spacewatch || — || align=right data-sort-value="0.94" | 940 m || 
|-id=003 bgcolor=#d6d6d6
| 339003 ||  || — || April 12, 2004 || Kitt Peak || Spacewatch || EOS || align=right | 2.1 km || 
|-id=004 bgcolor=#fefefe
| 339004 ||  || — || April 12, 2004 || Kitt Peak || Spacewatch || — || align=right data-sort-value="0.70" | 700 m || 
|-id=005 bgcolor=#d6d6d6
| 339005 ||  || — || April 12, 2004 || Kitt Peak || Spacewatch || — || align=right | 3.6 km || 
|-id=006 bgcolor=#d6d6d6
| 339006 ||  || — || April 13, 2004 || Kitt Peak || Spacewatch || — || align=right | 3.4 km || 
|-id=007 bgcolor=#d6d6d6
| 339007 ||  || — || April 13, 2004 || Kitt Peak || Spacewatch || HYG || align=right | 2.4 km || 
|-id=008 bgcolor=#d6d6d6
| 339008 ||  || — || April 14, 2004 || Kitt Peak || Spacewatch || — || align=right | 2.9 km || 
|-id=009 bgcolor=#fefefe
| 339009 ||  || — || April 14, 2004 || Kitt Peak || Spacewatch || NYS || align=right data-sort-value="0.72" | 720 m || 
|-id=010 bgcolor=#fefefe
| 339010 ||  || — || April 14, 2004 || Kitt Peak || Spacewatch || ERI || align=right | 1.5 km || 
|-id=011 bgcolor=#fefefe
| 339011 ||  || — || April 13, 2004 || Kitt Peak || Spacewatch || — || align=right | 1.0 km || 
|-id=012 bgcolor=#d6d6d6
| 339012 ||  || — || April 15, 2004 || Socorro || LINEAR || TIR || align=right | 3.5 km || 
|-id=013 bgcolor=#d6d6d6
| 339013 ||  || — || April 15, 2004 || Socorro || LINEAR || — || align=right | 4.7 km || 
|-id=014 bgcolor=#fefefe
| 339014 ||  || — || April 15, 2004 || Socorro || LINEAR || PHO || align=right | 1.1 km || 
|-id=015 bgcolor=#fefefe
| 339015 ||  || — || April 9, 2004 || Siding Spring || SSS || — || align=right data-sort-value="0.98" | 980 m || 
|-id=016 bgcolor=#fefefe
| 339016 ||  || — || April 12, 2004 || Palomar || NEAT || — || align=right | 1.4 km || 
|-id=017 bgcolor=#d6d6d6
| 339017 ||  || — || April 13, 2004 || Kitt Peak || Spacewatch || — || align=right | 3.2 km || 
|-id=018 bgcolor=#d6d6d6
| 339018 ||  || — || April 14, 2004 || Kitt Peak || Spacewatch || — || align=right | 3.3 km || 
|-id=019 bgcolor=#FA8072
| 339019 ||  || — || April 16, 2004 || Anderson Mesa || LONEOS || — || align=right data-sort-value="0.65" | 650 m || 
|-id=020 bgcolor=#fefefe
| 339020 ||  || — || April 16, 2004 || Kitt Peak || Spacewatch || — || align=right data-sort-value="0.87" | 870 m || 
|-id=021 bgcolor=#fefefe
| 339021 ||  || — || April 17, 2004 || Socorro || LINEAR || — || align=right | 1.0 km || 
|-id=022 bgcolor=#d6d6d6
| 339022 ||  || — || April 17, 2004 || Socorro || LINEAR || — || align=right | 4.1 km || 
|-id=023 bgcolor=#d6d6d6
| 339023 ||  || — || April 19, 2004 || Socorro || LINEAR || — || align=right | 3.2 km || 
|-id=024 bgcolor=#d6d6d6
| 339024 ||  || — || April 19, 2004 || Socorro || LINEAR || — || align=right | 4.2 km || 
|-id=025 bgcolor=#fefefe
| 339025 ||  || — || April 20, 2004 || Socorro || LINEAR || NYS || align=right data-sort-value="0.73" | 730 m || 
|-id=026 bgcolor=#fefefe
| 339026 ||  || — || April 20, 2004 || Socorro || LINEAR || — || align=right | 1.0 km || 
|-id=027 bgcolor=#fefefe
| 339027 ||  || — || April 21, 2004 || Socorro || LINEAR || — || align=right | 1.0 km || 
|-id=028 bgcolor=#fefefe
| 339028 ||  || — || March 23, 2004 || Socorro || LINEAR || FLO || align=right data-sort-value="0.92" | 920 m || 
|-id=029 bgcolor=#d6d6d6
| 339029 ||  || — || April 17, 2004 || Anderson Mesa || LONEOS || JLI || align=right | 5.6 km || 
|-id=030 bgcolor=#fefefe
| 339030 ||  || — || April 21, 2004 || Socorro || LINEAR || — || align=right | 1.1 km || 
|-id=031 bgcolor=#d6d6d6
| 339031 ||  || — || April 23, 2004 || Kitt Peak || Spacewatch || — || align=right | 4.1 km || 
|-id=032 bgcolor=#d6d6d6
| 339032 ||  || — || April 17, 2004 || Kitt Peak || Spacewatch || — || align=right | 3.9 km || 
|-id=033 bgcolor=#fefefe
| 339033 ||  || — || April 22, 2004 || Socorro || LINEAR || — || align=right | 1.1 km || 
|-id=034 bgcolor=#d6d6d6
| 339034 ||  || — || April 25, 2004 || Haleakala || NEAT || — || align=right | 3.7 km || 
|-id=035 bgcolor=#d6d6d6
| 339035 ||  || — || April 30, 2004 || Kitt Peak || Spacewatch || HYG || align=right | 2.6 km || 
|-id=036 bgcolor=#d6d6d6
| 339036 ||  || — || April 21, 2004 || Kitt Peak || Spacewatch || — || align=right | 2.9 km || 
|-id=037 bgcolor=#fefefe
| 339037 ||  || — || May 11, 2004 || Desert Eagle || W. K. Y. Yeung || — || align=right data-sort-value="0.84" | 840 m || 
|-id=038 bgcolor=#fefefe
| 339038 ||  || — || May 12, 2004 || Socorro || LINEAR || H || align=right data-sort-value="0.85" | 850 m || 
|-id=039 bgcolor=#fefefe
| 339039 ||  || — || May 9, 2004 || Kitt Peak || Spacewatch || V || align=right data-sort-value="0.98" | 980 m || 
|-id=040 bgcolor=#fefefe
| 339040 ||  || — || May 15, 2004 || Socorro || LINEAR || NYS || align=right data-sort-value="0.76" | 760 m || 
|-id=041 bgcolor=#fefefe
| 339041 ||  || — || May 13, 2004 || Palomar || NEAT || — || align=right data-sort-value="0.88" | 880 m || 
|-id=042 bgcolor=#fefefe
| 339042 ||  || — || May 15, 2004 || Campo Imperatore || CINEOS || FLO || align=right data-sort-value="0.83" | 830 m || 
|-id=043 bgcolor=#fefefe
| 339043 ||  || — || May 15, 2004 || Socorro || LINEAR || ERI || align=right | 2.0 km || 
|-id=044 bgcolor=#d6d6d6
| 339044 ||  || — || May 14, 2004 || Kitt Peak || Spacewatch || URS || align=right | 4.2 km || 
|-id=045 bgcolor=#fefefe
| 339045 ||  || — || May 16, 2004 || Siding Spring || SSS || V || align=right data-sort-value="0.75" | 750 m || 
|-id=046 bgcolor=#fefefe
| 339046 ||  || — || May 19, 2004 || Campo Imperatore || CINEOS || ERI || align=right | 1.7 km || 
|-id=047 bgcolor=#fefefe
| 339047 ||  || — || June 10, 2004 || Campo Imperatore || CINEOS || FLO || align=right data-sort-value="0.76" | 760 m || 
|-id=048 bgcolor=#fefefe
| 339048 ||  || — || June 13, 2004 || Socorro || LINEAR || — || align=right | 2.0 km || 
|-id=049 bgcolor=#fefefe
| 339049 ||  || — || June 14, 2004 || Kitt Peak || Spacewatch || SUL || align=right | 2.3 km || 
|-id=050 bgcolor=#fefefe
| 339050 ||  || — || June 20, 2004 || Reedy Creek || J. Broughton || — || align=right | 1.3 km || 
|-id=051 bgcolor=#FA8072
| 339051 ||  || — || June 21, 2004 || Socorro || LINEAR || H || align=right data-sort-value="0.93" | 930 m || 
|-id=052 bgcolor=#fefefe
| 339052 ||  || — || July 8, 2004 || Reedy Creek || J. Broughton || — || align=right | 1.1 km || 
|-id=053 bgcolor=#E9E9E9
| 339053 ||  || — || July 9, 2004 || Siding Spring || SSS || — || align=right | 1.7 km || 
|-id=054 bgcolor=#fefefe
| 339054 ||  || — || July 9, 2004 || Socorro || LINEAR || — || align=right | 1.1 km || 
|-id=055 bgcolor=#fefefe
| 339055 ||  || — || July 11, 2004 || Socorro || LINEAR || — || align=right | 1.3 km || 
|-id=056 bgcolor=#fefefe
| 339056 ||  || — || July 16, 2004 || Reedy Creek || J. Broughton || NYS || align=right data-sort-value="0.86" | 860 m || 
|-id=057 bgcolor=#fefefe
| 339057 ||  || — || July 16, 2004 || Socorro || LINEAR || — || align=right | 1.0 km || 
|-id=058 bgcolor=#fefefe
| 339058 ||  || — || August 6, 2004 || Palomar || NEAT || — || align=right | 1.00 km || 
|-id=059 bgcolor=#fefefe
| 339059 ||  || — || August 8, 2004 || Socorro || LINEAR || — || align=right data-sort-value="0.96" | 960 m || 
|-id=060 bgcolor=#fefefe
| 339060 ||  || — || August 8, 2004 || Socorro || LINEAR || NYScritical || align=right data-sort-value="0.76" | 760 m || 
|-id=061 bgcolor=#fefefe
| 339061 ||  || — || August 7, 2004 || Palomar || NEAT || H || align=right data-sort-value="0.74" | 740 m || 
|-id=062 bgcolor=#FA8072
| 339062 ||  || — || August 9, 2004 || Anderson Mesa || LONEOS || H || align=right data-sort-value="0.74" | 740 m || 
|-id=063 bgcolor=#fefefe
| 339063 ||  || — || August 8, 2004 || Socorro || LINEAR || NYS || align=right data-sort-value="0.72" | 720 m || 
|-id=064 bgcolor=#fefefe
| 339064 ||  || — || August 8, 2004 || Socorro || LINEAR || — || align=right | 1.5 km || 
|-id=065 bgcolor=#fefefe
| 339065 ||  || — || August 8, 2004 || Palomar || NEAT || H || align=right data-sort-value="0.68" | 680 m || 
|-id=066 bgcolor=#fefefe
| 339066 ||  || — || August 7, 2004 || Campo Imperatore || CINEOS || LCI || align=right | 1.1 km || 
|-id=067 bgcolor=#fefefe
| 339067 ||  || — || August 12, 2004 || Socorro || LINEAR || — || align=right | 1.3 km || 
|-id=068 bgcolor=#fefefe
| 339068 ||  || — || August 10, 2004 || Socorro || LINEAR || — || align=right | 1.0 km || 
|-id=069 bgcolor=#fefefe
| 339069 ||  || — || August 12, 2004 || Socorro || LINEAR || V || align=right | 1.1 km || 
|-id=070 bgcolor=#fefefe
| 339070 ||  || — || August 10, 2004 || Palomar || NEAT || H || align=right data-sort-value="0.83" | 830 m || 
|-id=071 bgcolor=#fefefe
| 339071 ||  || — || August 15, 2004 || Cerro Tololo || M. W. Buie || MAS || align=right data-sort-value="0.94" | 940 m || 
|-id=072 bgcolor=#FA8072
| 339072 ||  || — || August 20, 2004 || Socorro || LINEAR || — || align=right | 2.1 km || 
|-id=073 bgcolor=#fefefe
| 339073 ||  || — || August 20, 2004 || Siding Spring || SSS || — || align=right | 1.7 km || 
|-id=074 bgcolor=#fefefe
| 339074 ||  || — || August 23, 2004 || Kitt Peak || Spacewatch || — || align=right | 1.4 km || 
|-id=075 bgcolor=#fefefe
| 339075 ||  || — || September 6, 2004 || Socorro || LINEAR || H || align=right data-sort-value="0.74" | 740 m || 
|-id=076 bgcolor=#fefefe
| 339076 ||  || — || September 7, 2004 || Kitt Peak || Spacewatch || NYS || align=right data-sort-value="0.88" | 880 m || 
|-id=077 bgcolor=#E9E9E9
| 339077 ||  || — || September 7, 2004 || Socorro || LINEAR || — || align=right | 1.3 km || 
|-id=078 bgcolor=#fefefe
| 339078 ||  || — || September 7, 2004 || Kitt Peak || Spacewatch || NYS || align=right data-sort-value="0.79" | 790 m || 
|-id=079 bgcolor=#fefefe
| 339079 ||  || — || September 7, 2004 || Kitt Peak || Spacewatch || — || align=right data-sort-value="0.96" | 960 m || 
|-id=080 bgcolor=#fefefe
| 339080 ||  || — || September 8, 2004 || Socorro || LINEAR || H || align=right data-sort-value="0.73" | 730 m || 
|-id=081 bgcolor=#fefefe
| 339081 ||  || — || September 6, 2004 || Siding Spring || SSS || — || align=right data-sort-value="0.86" | 860 m || 
|-id=082 bgcolor=#fefefe
| 339082 ||  || — || September 7, 2004 || Kitt Peak || Spacewatch || — || align=right | 1.0 km || 
|-id=083 bgcolor=#fefefe
| 339083 ||  || — || September 8, 2004 || Socorro || LINEAR || — || align=right | 1.2 km || 
|-id=084 bgcolor=#fefefe
| 339084 ||  || — || September 8, 2004 || Socorro || LINEAR || H || align=right data-sort-value="0.78" | 780 m || 
|-id=085 bgcolor=#fefefe
| 339085 ||  || — || September 8, 2004 || Socorro || LINEAR || — || align=right | 1.3 km || 
|-id=086 bgcolor=#fefefe
| 339086 ||  || — || September 7, 2004 || Socorro || LINEAR || — || align=right | 1.2 km || 
|-id=087 bgcolor=#E9E9E9
| 339087 ||  || — || September 8, 2004 || Socorro || LINEAR || — || align=right data-sort-value="0.78" | 780 m || 
|-id=088 bgcolor=#fefefe
| 339088 ||  || — || September 10, 2004 || Needville || Needville Obs. || H || align=right data-sort-value="0.84" | 840 m || 
|-id=089 bgcolor=#fefefe
| 339089 ||  || — || September 11, 2004 || Socorro || LINEAR || H || align=right data-sort-value="0.76" | 760 m || 
|-id=090 bgcolor=#FA8072
| 339090 ||  || — || September 7, 2004 || Palomar || NEAT || H || align=right | 1.2 km || 
|-id=091 bgcolor=#E9E9E9
| 339091 ||  || — || September 7, 2004 || Palomar || NEAT || — || align=right data-sort-value="0.83" | 830 m || 
|-id=092 bgcolor=#E9E9E9
| 339092 ||  || — || September 7, 2004 || Kitt Peak || Spacewatch || — || align=right | 1.5 km || 
|-id=093 bgcolor=#fefefe
| 339093 ||  || — || September 9, 2004 || Socorro || LINEAR || — || align=right | 1.3 km || 
|-id=094 bgcolor=#E9E9E9
| 339094 ||  || — || September 10, 2004 || Socorro || LINEAR || — || align=right data-sort-value="0.92" | 920 m || 
|-id=095 bgcolor=#fefefe
| 339095 ||  || — || September 10, 2004 || Socorro || LINEAR || critical || align=right data-sort-value="0.90" | 900 m || 
|-id=096 bgcolor=#fefefe
| 339096 ||  || — || September 10, 2004 || Socorro || LINEAR || H || align=right data-sort-value="0.70" | 700 m || 
|-id=097 bgcolor=#E9E9E9
| 339097 ||  || — || September 11, 2004 || Socorro || LINEAR || — || align=right | 1.1 km || 
|-id=098 bgcolor=#fefefe
| 339098 ||  || — || September 7, 2004 || Socorro || LINEAR || MAS || align=right data-sort-value="0.83" | 830 m || 
|-id=099 bgcolor=#E9E9E9
| 339099 ||  || — || September 7, 2004 || Palomar || NEAT || — || align=right | 1.2 km || 
|-id=100 bgcolor=#E9E9E9
| 339100 ||  || — || September 8, 2004 || Socorro || LINEAR || — || align=right | 1.0 km || 
|}

339101–339200 

|-bgcolor=#E9E9E9
| 339101 ||  || — || September 9, 2004 || Socorro || LINEAR || ADE || align=right | 3.2 km || 
|-id=102 bgcolor=#fefefe
| 339102 ||  || — || September 10, 2004 || Socorro || LINEAR || — || align=right | 1.2 km || 
|-id=103 bgcolor=#fefefe
| 339103 ||  || — || September 10, 2004 || Socorro || LINEAR || — || align=right | 1.2 km || 
|-id=104 bgcolor=#fefefe
| 339104 ||  || — || September 10, 2004 || Socorro || LINEAR || — || align=right | 1.2 km || 
|-id=105 bgcolor=#fefefe
| 339105 ||  || — || September 12, 2004 || Kitt Peak || Spacewatch || — || align=right data-sort-value="0.70" | 700 m || 
|-id=106 bgcolor=#d6d6d6
| 339106 ||  || — || September 11, 2004 || Socorro || LINEAR || ALA || align=right | 5.5 km || 
|-id=107 bgcolor=#fefefe
| 339107 ||  || — || September 11, 2004 || Socorro || LINEAR || — || align=right | 1.3 km || 
|-id=108 bgcolor=#E9E9E9
| 339108 ||  || — || September 11, 2004 || Socorro || LINEAR || — || align=right | 1.2 km || 
|-id=109 bgcolor=#E9E9E9
| 339109 ||  || — || September 11, 2004 || Socorro || LINEAR || EUN || align=right | 1.8 km || 
|-id=110 bgcolor=#E9E9E9
| 339110 ||  || — || September 11, 2004 || Socorro || LINEAR || — || align=right | 1.4 km || 
|-id=111 bgcolor=#E9E9E9
| 339111 ||  || — || September 11, 2004 || Socorro || LINEAR || — || align=right | 1.8 km || 
|-id=112 bgcolor=#fefefe
| 339112 ||  || — || September 12, 2004 || Socorro || LINEAR || — || align=right | 1.4 km || 
|-id=113 bgcolor=#fefefe
| 339113 ||  || — || September 8, 2004 || Socorro || LINEAR || NYS || align=right data-sort-value="0.79" | 790 m || 
|-id=114 bgcolor=#E9E9E9
| 339114 ||  || — || September 9, 2004 || Kitt Peak || Spacewatch || — || align=right | 1.4 km || 
|-id=115 bgcolor=#E9E9E9
| 339115 ||  || — || September 9, 2004 || Kitt Peak || Spacewatch || — || align=right data-sort-value="0.64" | 640 m || 
|-id=116 bgcolor=#E9E9E9
| 339116 ||  || — || September 9, 2004 || Kitt Peak || Spacewatch || — || align=right data-sort-value="0.80" | 800 m || 
|-id=117 bgcolor=#E9E9E9
| 339117 ||  || — || September 11, 2004 || Socorro || LINEAR || — || align=right | 4.4 km || 
|-id=118 bgcolor=#fefefe
| 339118 ||  || — || September 12, 2004 || Socorro || LINEAR || H || align=right data-sort-value="0.84" | 840 m || 
|-id=119 bgcolor=#fefefe
| 339119 ||  || — || September 12, 2004 || Socorro || LINEAR || H || align=right data-sort-value="0.78" | 780 m || 
|-id=120 bgcolor=#fefefe
| 339120 ||  || — || September 12, 2004 || Socorro || LINEAR || H || align=right data-sort-value="0.81" | 810 m || 
|-id=121 bgcolor=#fefefe
| 339121 ||  || — || September 15, 2004 || Mauna Kea || J. Pittichová, J. Bedient || — || align=right data-sort-value="0.90" | 900 m || 
|-id=122 bgcolor=#fefefe
| 339122 ||  || — || September 6, 2004 || Palomar || NEAT || H || align=right data-sort-value="0.77" | 770 m || 
|-id=123 bgcolor=#fefefe
| 339123 ||  || — || September 10, 2004 || Kitt Peak || Spacewatch || — || align=right data-sort-value="0.91" | 910 m || 
|-id=124 bgcolor=#fefefe
| 339124 ||  || — || September 10, 2004 || Socorro || LINEAR || H || align=right data-sort-value="0.88" | 880 m || 
|-id=125 bgcolor=#fefefe
| 339125 ||  || — || September 12, 2004 || Kitt Peak || Spacewatch || — || align=right data-sort-value="0.82" | 820 m || 
|-id=126 bgcolor=#E9E9E9
| 339126 ||  || — || September 13, 2004 || Kitt Peak || Spacewatch || — || align=right | 2.0 km || 
|-id=127 bgcolor=#E9E9E9
| 339127 ||  || — || September 13, 2004 || Palomar || NEAT || — || align=right | 1.2 km || 
|-id=128 bgcolor=#E9E9E9
| 339128 ||  || — || September 13, 2004 || Socorro || LINEAR || — || align=right | 1.9 km || 
|-id=129 bgcolor=#E9E9E9
| 339129 ||  || — || September 15, 2004 || Anderson Mesa || LONEOS || — || align=right | 1.2 km || 
|-id=130 bgcolor=#E9E9E9
| 339130 ||  || — || September 15, 2004 || Kitt Peak || Spacewatch || critical || align=right data-sort-value="0.57" | 570 m || 
|-id=131 bgcolor=#E9E9E9
| 339131 ||  || — || September 15, 2004 || Kitt Peak || Spacewatch || — || align=right data-sort-value="0.74" | 740 m || 
|-id=132 bgcolor=#E9E9E9
| 339132 ||  || — || September 7, 2004 || Kitt Peak || Spacewatch || — || align=right data-sort-value="0.76" | 760 m || 
|-id=133 bgcolor=#fefefe
| 339133 ||  || — || September 16, 2004 || Siding Spring || SSS || — || align=right | 1.4 km || 
|-id=134 bgcolor=#fefefe
| 339134 ||  || — || September 16, 2004 || Siding Spring || SSS || LCI || align=right | 1.5 km || 
|-id=135 bgcolor=#fefefe
| 339135 ||  || — || September 17, 2004 || Anderson Mesa || LONEOS || — || align=right | 1.7 km || 
|-id=136 bgcolor=#d6d6d6
| 339136 ||  || — || September 18, 2004 || Socorro || LINEAR || Tj (2.96) || align=right | 5.6 km || 
|-id=137 bgcolor=#E9E9E9
| 339137 ||  || — || September 18, 2004 || Socorro || LINEAR || — || align=right | 2.4 km || 
|-id=138 bgcolor=#E9E9E9
| 339138 ||  || — || September 21, 2004 || Socorro || LINEAR || — || align=right | 1.0 km || 
|-id=139 bgcolor=#fefefe
| 339139 ||  || — || September 21, 2004 || Socorro || LINEAR || H || align=right data-sort-value="0.67" | 670 m || 
|-id=140 bgcolor=#fefefe
| 339140 ||  || — || September 23, 2004 || Socorro || LINEAR || H || align=right data-sort-value="0.85" | 850 m || 
|-id=141 bgcolor=#E9E9E9
| 339141 || 2004 TJ || — || October 3, 2004 || Goodricke-Pigott || R. A. Tucker || — || align=right | 1.1 km || 
|-id=142 bgcolor=#E9E9E9
| 339142 ||  || — || October 4, 2004 || Kitt Peak || Spacewatch || — || align=right data-sort-value="0.97" | 970 m || 
|-id=143 bgcolor=#E9E9E9
| 339143 ||  || — || October 4, 2004 || Kitt Peak || Spacewatch || — || align=right | 1.4 km || 
|-id=144 bgcolor=#E9E9E9
| 339144 ||  || — || October 5, 2004 || Kitt Peak || Spacewatch || — || align=right | 1.2 km || 
|-id=145 bgcolor=#E9E9E9
| 339145 ||  || — || October 5, 2004 || Kitt Peak || Spacewatch || — || align=right | 1.1 km || 
|-id=146 bgcolor=#fefefe
| 339146 ||  || — || October 5, 2004 || Socorro || LINEAR || V || align=right | 1.0 km || 
|-id=147 bgcolor=#FA8072
| 339147 ||  || — || October 6, 2004 || Kitt Peak || Spacewatch || — || align=right data-sort-value="0.52" | 520 m || 
|-id=148 bgcolor=#FA8072
| 339148 ||  || — || October 7, 2004 || Socorro || LINEAR || — || align=right | 2.5 km || 
|-id=149 bgcolor=#fefefe
| 339149 ||  || — || October 8, 2004 || Kitt Peak || Spacewatch || H || align=right data-sort-value="0.51" | 510 m || 
|-id=150 bgcolor=#fefefe
| 339150 ||  || — || September 12, 2004 || Socorro || LINEAR || H || align=right data-sort-value="0.74" | 740 m || 
|-id=151 bgcolor=#fefefe
| 339151 ||  || — || October 8, 2004 || Socorro || LINEAR || H || align=right data-sort-value="0.79" | 790 m || 
|-id=152 bgcolor=#E9E9E9
| 339152 ||  || — || October 4, 2004 || Kitt Peak || Spacewatch || — || align=right data-sort-value="0.87" | 870 m || 
|-id=153 bgcolor=#d6d6d6
| 339153 ||  || — || October 4, 2004 || Kitt Peak || Spacewatch || HIL3:2 || align=right | 7.2 km || 
|-id=154 bgcolor=#fefefe
| 339154 ||  || — || October 4, 2004 || Kitt Peak || Spacewatch || — || align=right data-sort-value="0.91" | 910 m || 
|-id=155 bgcolor=#E9E9E9
| 339155 ||  || — || October 4, 2004 || Kitt Peak || Spacewatch || — || align=right data-sort-value="0.97" | 970 m || 
|-id=156 bgcolor=#E9E9E9
| 339156 ||  || — || October 4, 2004 || Kitt Peak || Spacewatch || — || align=right | 1.6 km || 
|-id=157 bgcolor=#E9E9E9
| 339157 ||  || — || October 4, 2004 || Kitt Peak || Spacewatch || — || align=right | 1.00 km || 
|-id=158 bgcolor=#E9E9E9
| 339158 ||  || — || October 4, 2004 || Kitt Peak || Spacewatch || — || align=right | 1.4 km || 
|-id=159 bgcolor=#E9E9E9
| 339159 ||  || — || October 4, 2004 || Kitt Peak || Spacewatch || EUN || align=right | 1.2 km || 
|-id=160 bgcolor=#E9E9E9
| 339160 ||  || — || October 5, 2004 || Kitt Peak || Spacewatch || — || align=right data-sort-value="0.82" | 820 m || 
|-id=161 bgcolor=#fefefe
| 339161 ||  || — || October 5, 2004 || Anderson Mesa || LONEOS || — || align=right data-sort-value="0.94" | 940 m || 
|-id=162 bgcolor=#E9E9E9
| 339162 ||  || — || October 5, 2004 || Kitt Peak || Spacewatch || — || align=right | 1.2 km || 
|-id=163 bgcolor=#E9E9E9
| 339163 ||  || — || October 5, 2004 || Anderson Mesa || LONEOS || — || align=right data-sort-value="0.94" | 940 m || 
|-id=164 bgcolor=#fefefe
| 339164 ||  || — || October 5, 2004 || Anderson Mesa || LONEOS || H || align=right data-sort-value="0.98" | 980 m || 
|-id=165 bgcolor=#E9E9E9
| 339165 ||  || — || October 5, 2004 || Anderson Mesa || LONEOS || — || align=right | 1.1 km || 
|-id=166 bgcolor=#E9E9E9
| 339166 ||  || — || October 5, 2004 || Anderson Mesa || LONEOS || — || align=right | 1.1 km || 
|-id=167 bgcolor=#d6d6d6
| 339167 ||  || — || July 29, 2004 || Siding Spring || SSS || HIL3:2 || align=right | 7.6 km || 
|-id=168 bgcolor=#fefefe
| 339168 ||  || — || October 15, 2004 || Anderson Mesa || LONEOS || H || align=right data-sort-value="0.54" | 540 m || 
|-id=169 bgcolor=#E9E9E9
| 339169 ||  || — || October 5, 2004 || Kitt Peak || Spacewatch || — || align=right data-sort-value="0.87" | 870 m || 
|-id=170 bgcolor=#fefefe
| 339170 ||  || — || October 5, 2004 || Kitt Peak || Spacewatch || MAS || align=right data-sort-value="0.76" | 760 m || 
|-id=171 bgcolor=#E9E9E9
| 339171 ||  || — || October 5, 2004 || Kitt Peak || Spacewatch || — || align=right data-sort-value="0.59" | 590 m || 
|-id=172 bgcolor=#E9E9E9
| 339172 ||  || — || October 5, 2004 || Kitt Peak || Spacewatch || — || align=right data-sort-value="0.99" | 990 m || 
|-id=173 bgcolor=#E9E9E9
| 339173 ||  || — || October 5, 2004 || Kitt Peak || Spacewatch || — || align=right data-sort-value="0.85" | 850 m || 
|-id=174 bgcolor=#E9E9E9
| 339174 ||  || — || October 7, 2004 || Kitt Peak || Spacewatch || — || align=right data-sort-value="0.94" | 940 m || 
|-id=175 bgcolor=#E9E9E9
| 339175 ||  || — || October 7, 2004 || Socorro || LINEAR || — || align=right | 1.6 km || 
|-id=176 bgcolor=#E9E9E9
| 339176 ||  || — || October 8, 2004 || Kitt Peak || Spacewatch || — || align=right | 1.2 km || 
|-id=177 bgcolor=#E9E9E9
| 339177 ||  || — || October 7, 2004 || Socorro || LINEAR || — || align=right | 2.1 km || 
|-id=178 bgcolor=#fefefe
| 339178 ||  || — || October 8, 2004 || Anderson Mesa || LONEOS || — || align=right | 1.1 km || 
|-id=179 bgcolor=#fefefe
| 339179 ||  || — || October 8, 2004 || Anderson Mesa || LONEOS || H || align=right data-sort-value="0.63" | 630 m || 
|-id=180 bgcolor=#E9E9E9
| 339180 ||  || — || October 4, 2004 || Kitt Peak || Spacewatch || — || align=right data-sort-value="0.98" | 980 m || 
|-id=181 bgcolor=#E9E9E9
| 339181 ||  || — || October 5, 2004 || Kitt Peak || Spacewatch || — || align=right data-sort-value="0.91" | 910 m || 
|-id=182 bgcolor=#E9E9E9
| 339182 ||  || — || October 6, 2004 || Kitt Peak || Spacewatch || — || align=right data-sort-value="0.96" | 960 m || 
|-id=183 bgcolor=#d6d6d6
| 339183 ||  || — || October 6, 2004 || Kitt Peak || Spacewatch || SHU3:2 || align=right | 6.0 km || 
|-id=184 bgcolor=#d6d6d6
| 339184 ||  || — || October 6, 2004 || Kitt Peak || Spacewatch || SHU3:2 || align=right | 5.5 km || 
|-id=185 bgcolor=#E9E9E9
| 339185 ||  || — || October 6, 2004 || Kitt Peak || Spacewatch || KON || align=right | 3.4 km || 
|-id=186 bgcolor=#E9E9E9
| 339186 ||  || — || October 6, 2004 || Kitt Peak || Spacewatch || MAR || align=right | 1.4 km || 
|-id=187 bgcolor=#E9E9E9
| 339187 ||  || — || October 6, 2004 || Kitt Peak || Spacewatch || — || align=right data-sort-value="0.78" | 780 m || 
|-id=188 bgcolor=#fefefe
| 339188 ||  || — || October 7, 2004 || Kitt Peak || Spacewatch || — || align=right data-sort-value="0.74" | 740 m || 
|-id=189 bgcolor=#E9E9E9
| 339189 ||  || — || October 7, 2004 || Socorro || LINEAR || — || align=right data-sort-value="0.83" | 830 m || 
|-id=190 bgcolor=#fefefe
| 339190 ||  || — || October 8, 2004 || Socorro || LINEAR || H || align=right data-sort-value="0.74" | 740 m || 
|-id=191 bgcolor=#d6d6d6
| 339191 ||  || — || October 7, 2004 || Kitt Peak || Spacewatch || HIL3:2 || align=right | 7.1 km || 
|-id=192 bgcolor=#fefefe
| 339192 ||  || — || October 7, 2004 || Kitt Peak || Spacewatch || H || align=right data-sort-value="0.73" | 730 m || 
|-id=193 bgcolor=#E9E9E9
| 339193 ||  || — || October 7, 2004 || Kitt Peak || Spacewatch || — || align=right data-sort-value="0.80" | 800 m || 
|-id=194 bgcolor=#E9E9E9
| 339194 ||  || — || October 7, 2004 || Kitt Peak || Spacewatch || — || align=right data-sort-value="0.83" | 830 m || 
|-id=195 bgcolor=#E9E9E9
| 339195 ||  || — || October 7, 2004 || Kitt Peak || Spacewatch || — || align=right data-sort-value="0.91" | 910 m || 
|-id=196 bgcolor=#E9E9E9
| 339196 ||  || — || October 8, 2004 || Kitt Peak || Spacewatch || — || align=right | 1.0 km || 
|-id=197 bgcolor=#E9E9E9
| 339197 ||  || — || October 8, 2004 || Kitt Peak || Spacewatch || — || align=right data-sort-value="0.82" | 820 m || 
|-id=198 bgcolor=#E9E9E9
| 339198 ||  || — || October 5, 2004 || Kitt Peak || Spacewatch || — || align=right | 1.1 km || 
|-id=199 bgcolor=#E9E9E9
| 339199 ||  || — || October 7, 2004 || Palomar || NEAT || — || align=right | 1.9 km || 
|-id=200 bgcolor=#d6d6d6
| 339200 ||  || — || October 8, 2004 || Kitt Peak || Spacewatch || SHU3:2 || align=right | 6.0 km || 
|}

339201–339300 

|-bgcolor=#E9E9E9
| 339201 ||  || — || February 12, 2002 || Palomar || NEAT || EUN || align=right | 1.6 km || 
|-id=202 bgcolor=#d6d6d6
| 339202 ||  || — || October 8, 2004 || Kitt Peak || Spacewatch || 3:2 || align=right | 4.8 km || 
|-id=203 bgcolor=#E9E9E9
| 339203 ||  || — || April 5, 2003 || Kitt Peak || Spacewatch || ADE || align=right | 1.6 km || 
|-id=204 bgcolor=#E9E9E9
| 339204 ||  || — || October 7, 2004 || Kitt Peak || Spacewatch || — || align=right data-sort-value="0.90" | 900 m || 
|-id=205 bgcolor=#E9E9E9
| 339205 ||  || — || October 9, 2004 || Kitt Peak || Spacewatch || — || align=right | 1.0 km || 
|-id=206 bgcolor=#E9E9E9
| 339206 ||  || — || October 9, 2004 || Kitt Peak || Spacewatch || — || align=right data-sort-value="0.88" | 880 m || 
|-id=207 bgcolor=#E9E9E9
| 339207 ||  || — || October 9, 2004 || Kitt Peak || Spacewatch || — || align=right data-sort-value="0.94" | 940 m || 
|-id=208 bgcolor=#E9E9E9
| 339208 ||  || — || October 9, 2004 || Kitt Peak || Spacewatch || — || align=right data-sort-value="0.81" | 810 m || 
|-id=209 bgcolor=#E9E9E9
| 339209 ||  || — || October 9, 2004 || Kitt Peak || Spacewatch || — || align=right | 1.1 km || 
|-id=210 bgcolor=#E9E9E9
| 339210 ||  || — || October 9, 2004 || Kitt Peak || Spacewatch || — || align=right | 1.3 km || 
|-id=211 bgcolor=#E9E9E9
| 339211 ||  || — || October 9, 2004 || Kitt Peak || Spacewatch || — || align=right | 1.3 km || 
|-id=212 bgcolor=#E9E9E9
| 339212 ||  || — || October 9, 2004 || Kitt Peak || Spacewatch || — || align=right | 1.6 km || 
|-id=213 bgcolor=#E9E9E9
| 339213 ||  || — || October 9, 2004 || Kitt Peak || Spacewatch || — || align=right | 1.5 km || 
|-id=214 bgcolor=#E9E9E9
| 339214 ||  || — || October 9, 2004 || Kitt Peak || Spacewatch || — || align=right | 1.9 km || 
|-id=215 bgcolor=#E9E9E9
| 339215 ||  || — || October 9, 2004 || Kitt Peak || Spacewatch || — || align=right | 1.1 km || 
|-id=216 bgcolor=#fefefe
| 339216 ||  || — || October 9, 2004 || Socorro || LINEAR || H || align=right data-sort-value="0.85" | 850 m || 
|-id=217 bgcolor=#fefefe
| 339217 ||  || — || October 9, 2004 || Kitt Peak || Spacewatch || MAS || align=right | 1.0 km || 
|-id=218 bgcolor=#E9E9E9
| 339218 ||  || — || October 8, 2004 || Anderson Mesa || LONEOS || critical || align=right data-sort-value="0.82" | 820 m || 
|-id=219 bgcolor=#E9E9E9
| 339219 ||  || — || October 8, 2004 || Socorro || LINEAR || — || align=right | 1.9 km || 
|-id=220 bgcolor=#E9E9E9
| 339220 ||  || — || October 10, 2004 || Socorro || LINEAR || — || align=right | 1.4 km || 
|-id=221 bgcolor=#E9E9E9
| 339221 ||  || — || October 11, 2004 || Kitt Peak || Spacewatch || — || align=right | 1.1 km || 
|-id=222 bgcolor=#E9E9E9
| 339222 ||  || — || October 11, 2004 || Kitt Peak || Spacewatch || — || align=right | 1.5 km || 
|-id=223 bgcolor=#E9E9E9
| 339223 Stongemorin ||  ||  || October 13, 2004 || Jarnac || Jarnac Obs. || — || align=right data-sort-value="0.77" | 770 m || 
|-id=224 bgcolor=#E9E9E9
| 339224 ||  || — || October 14, 2004 || Socorro || LINEAR || — || align=right | 1.5 km || 
|-id=225 bgcolor=#E9E9E9
| 339225 ||  || — || October 14, 2004 || Palomar || NEAT || EUN || align=right | 1.3 km || 
|-id=226 bgcolor=#E9E9E9
| 339226 ||  || — || October 9, 2004 || Kitt Peak || Spacewatch || — || align=right data-sort-value="0.80" | 800 m || 
|-id=227 bgcolor=#E9E9E9
| 339227 ||  || — || October 13, 2004 || Anderson Mesa || LONEOS || EUN || align=right | 1.6 km || 
|-id=228 bgcolor=#E9E9E9
| 339228 ||  || — || October 10, 2004 || Socorro || LINEAR || RAF || align=right | 1.1 km || 
|-id=229 bgcolor=#E9E9E9
| 339229 ||  || — || October 4, 2004 || Kitt Peak || Spacewatch || — || align=right | 1.0 km || 
|-id=230 bgcolor=#E9E9E9
| 339230 ||  || — || October 5, 2004 || Kitt Peak || Spacewatch || — || align=right data-sort-value="0.74" | 740 m || 
|-id=231 bgcolor=#E9E9E9
| 339231 ||  || — || October 10, 2004 || Kitt Peak || Spacewatch || — || align=right data-sort-value="0.92" | 920 m || 
|-id=232 bgcolor=#fefefe
| 339232 ||  || — || October 16, 2004 || Socorro || LINEAR || H || align=right | 1.2 km || 
|-id=233 bgcolor=#FA8072
| 339233 ||  || — || October 16, 2004 || Socorro || LINEAR || — || align=right | 3.5 km || 
|-id=234 bgcolor=#E9E9E9
| 339234 ||  || — || October 20, 2004 || Socorro || LINEAR || — || align=right | 1.2 km || 
|-id=235 bgcolor=#E9E9E9
| 339235 ||  || — || October 23, 2004 || Kitt Peak || Spacewatch || — || align=right data-sort-value="0.85" | 850 m || 
|-id=236 bgcolor=#E9E9E9
| 339236 ||  || — || October 23, 2004 || Kitt Peak || Spacewatch || — || align=right | 1.4 km || 
|-id=237 bgcolor=#fefefe
| 339237 ||  || — || October 25, 2004 || Socorro || LINEAR || H || align=right | 1.1 km || 
|-id=238 bgcolor=#E9E9E9
| 339238 ||  || — || November 4, 2004 || Kitt Peak || Spacewatch || — || align=right | 2.5 km || 
|-id=239 bgcolor=#E9E9E9
| 339239 ||  || — || November 3, 2004 || Kitt Peak || Spacewatch || KRM || align=right | 3.3 km || 
|-id=240 bgcolor=#E9E9E9
| 339240 ||  || — || November 4, 2004 || Kitt Peak || Spacewatch || — || align=right | 1.0 km || 
|-id=241 bgcolor=#E9E9E9
| 339241 ||  || — || November 5, 2004 || Palomar || NEAT || — || align=right data-sort-value="0.87" | 870 m || 
|-id=242 bgcolor=#E9E9E9
| 339242 ||  || — || November 3, 2004 || Palomar || NEAT || — || align=right data-sort-value="0.89" | 890 m || 
|-id=243 bgcolor=#E9E9E9
| 339243 ||  || — || November 4, 2004 || Kitt Peak || Spacewatch || — || align=right | 1.3 km || 
|-id=244 bgcolor=#E9E9E9
| 339244 ||  || — || November 4, 2004 || Catalina || CSS || — || align=right | 3.6 km || 
|-id=245 bgcolor=#E9E9E9
| 339245 ||  || — || November 4, 2004 || Catalina || CSS || — || align=right | 1.1 km || 
|-id=246 bgcolor=#fefefe
| 339246 ||  || — || November 5, 2004 || Palomar || NEAT || H || align=right data-sort-value="0.87" | 870 m || 
|-id=247 bgcolor=#E9E9E9
| 339247 ||  || — || November 6, 2004 || Palomar || NEAT || — || align=right | 1.5 km || 
|-id=248 bgcolor=#E9E9E9
| 339248 ||  || — || November 3, 2004 || Kitt Peak || Spacewatch || — || align=right | 1.0 km || 
|-id=249 bgcolor=#E9E9E9
| 339249 ||  || — || November 4, 2004 || Kitt Peak || Spacewatch || — || align=right data-sort-value="0.92" | 920 m || 
|-id=250 bgcolor=#E9E9E9
| 339250 ||  || — || November 4, 2004 || Kitt Peak || Spacewatch || GER || align=right | 1.7 km || 
|-id=251 bgcolor=#E9E9E9
| 339251 ||  || — || November 5, 2004 || Palomar || NEAT || — || align=right | 1.4 km || 
|-id=252 bgcolor=#E9E9E9
| 339252 ||  || — || November 3, 2004 || Socorro || LINEAR || — || align=right | 1.7 km || 
|-id=253 bgcolor=#fefefe
| 339253 ||  || — || November 4, 2004 || Catalina || CSS || H || align=right data-sort-value="0.91" | 910 m || 
|-id=254 bgcolor=#E9E9E9
| 339254 ||  || — || November 4, 2004 || Anderson Mesa || LONEOS || — || align=right | 2.6 km || 
|-id=255 bgcolor=#E9E9E9
| 339255 ||  || — || November 5, 2004 || Palomar || NEAT || — || align=right | 1.1 km || 
|-id=256 bgcolor=#E9E9E9
| 339256 ||  || — || November 9, 2004 || Catalina || CSS || ADE || align=right | 2.2 km || 
|-id=257 bgcolor=#E9E9E9
| 339257 ||  || — || November 9, 2004 || Catalina || CSS || — || align=right | 1.3 km || 
|-id=258 bgcolor=#E9E9E9
| 339258 ||  || — || November 9, 2004 || Catalina || CSS || IAN || align=right | 1.6 km || 
|-id=259 bgcolor=#E9E9E9
| 339259 ||  || — || November 4, 2004 || Kitt Peak || Spacewatch || — || align=right data-sort-value="0.90" | 900 m || 
|-id=260 bgcolor=#E9E9E9
| 339260 ||  || — || November 11, 2004 || Kitt Peak || Spacewatch || — || align=right | 1.4 km || 
|-id=261 bgcolor=#E9E9E9
| 339261 ||  || — || November 11, 2004 || Kitt Peak || M. W. Buie || GER || align=right | 1.4 km || 
|-id=262 bgcolor=#fefefe
| 339262 ||  || — || November 4, 2004 || Catalina || CSS || H || align=right | 1.0 km || 
|-id=263 bgcolor=#E9E9E9
| 339263 ||  || — || November 11, 2004 || Kitt Peak || Spacewatch || — || align=right | 1.4 km || 
|-id=264 bgcolor=#E9E9E9
| 339264 ||  || — || November 11, 2004 || Kitt Peak || Spacewatch || — || align=right | 1.4 km || 
|-id=265 bgcolor=#fefefe
| 339265 ||  || — || November 2, 2004 || Anderson Mesa || LONEOS || H || align=right data-sort-value="0.77" | 770 m || 
|-id=266 bgcolor=#E9E9E9
| 339266 ||  || — || November 3, 2004 || Anderson Mesa || LONEOS || — || align=right | 1.4 km || 
|-id=267 bgcolor=#E9E9E9
| 339267 ||  || — || November 3, 2004 || Kitt Peak || Spacewatch || — || align=right | 4.1 km || 
|-id=268 bgcolor=#E9E9E9
| 339268 ||  || — || November 3, 2004 || Anderson Mesa || LONEOS || — || align=right | 1.1 km || 
|-id=269 bgcolor=#E9E9E9
| 339269 ||  || — || November 17, 2004 || Siding Spring || SSS || — || align=right data-sort-value="0.99" | 990 m || 
|-id=270 bgcolor=#E9E9E9
| 339270 ||  || — || November 19, 2004 || Socorro || LINEAR || — || align=right | 1.1 km || 
|-id=271 bgcolor=#E9E9E9
| 339271 ||  || — || November 30, 2004 || Palomar || NEAT || EUN || align=right | 1.5 km || 
|-id=272 bgcolor=#E9E9E9
| 339272 ||  || — || November 20, 2004 || Kitt Peak || Spacewatch || — || align=right | 1.4 km || 
|-id=273 bgcolor=#E9E9E9
| 339273 ||  || — || December 2, 2004 || Catalina || CSS || — || align=right | 2.0 km || 
|-id=274 bgcolor=#E9E9E9
| 339274 ||  || — || December 2, 2004 || Antares || ARO || — || align=right | 1.3 km || 
|-id=275 bgcolor=#E9E9E9
| 339275 ||  || — || December 2, 2004 || Socorro || LINEAR || — || align=right | 1.2 km || 
|-id=276 bgcolor=#E9E9E9
| 339276 ||  || — || December 2, 2004 || Socorro || LINEAR || — || align=right | 2.7 km || 
|-id=277 bgcolor=#E9E9E9
| 339277 ||  || — || December 2, 2004 || Catalina || CSS || — || align=right | 1.4 km || 
|-id=278 bgcolor=#E9E9E9
| 339278 ||  || — || December 3, 2004 || Kitt Peak || Spacewatch || — || align=right | 1.4 km || 
|-id=279 bgcolor=#E9E9E9
| 339279 ||  || — || December 3, 2004 || Kitt Peak || Spacewatch || AER || align=right | 1.5 km || 
|-id=280 bgcolor=#FA8072
| 339280 ||  || — || December 10, 2004 || Kitt Peak || Spacewatch || — || align=right | 2.1 km || 
|-id=281 bgcolor=#E9E9E9
| 339281 ||  || — || December 9, 2004 || Catalina || CSS || — || align=right | 2.6 km || 
|-id=282 bgcolor=#E9E9E9
| 339282 ||  || — || December 3, 2004 || Kitt Peak || Spacewatch || — || align=right | 2.5 km || 
|-id=283 bgcolor=#E9E9E9
| 339283 ||  || — || December 7, 2004 || Socorro || LINEAR || — || align=right | 2.4 km || 
|-id=284 bgcolor=#E9E9E9
| 339284 ||  || — || December 8, 2004 || Socorro || LINEAR || — || align=right | 1.4 km || 
|-id=285 bgcolor=#E9E9E9
| 339285 ||  || — || December 8, 2004 || Socorro || LINEAR || MAR || align=right | 1.3 km || 
|-id=286 bgcolor=#E9E9E9
| 339286 ||  || — || December 8, 2004 || Socorro || LINEAR || — || align=right | 2.0 km || 
|-id=287 bgcolor=#E9E9E9
| 339287 ||  || — || December 9, 2004 || Socorro || LINEAR || — || align=right | 1.2 km || 
|-id=288 bgcolor=#E9E9E9
| 339288 ||  || — || December 9, 2004 || Catalina || CSS || EUN || align=right | 1.8 km || 
|-id=289 bgcolor=#E9E9E9
| 339289 ||  || — || December 9, 2004 || Kitt Peak || Spacewatch || — || align=right | 1.2 km || 
|-id=290 bgcolor=#E9E9E9
| 339290 ||  || — || December 10, 2004 || Socorro || LINEAR || MAR || align=right | 1.8 km || 
|-id=291 bgcolor=#E9E9E9
| 339291 ||  || — || December 10, 2004 || Socorro || LINEAR || — || align=right | 1.2 km || 
|-id=292 bgcolor=#E9E9E9
| 339292 ||  || — || December 11, 2004 || Socorro || LINEAR || — || align=right | 1.3 km || 
|-id=293 bgcolor=#E9E9E9
| 339293 ||  || — || December 8, 2004 || Socorro || LINEAR || — || align=right | 1.9 km || 
|-id=294 bgcolor=#E9E9E9
| 339294 ||  || — || December 2, 2004 || Catalina || CSS || — || align=right | 1.6 km || 
|-id=295 bgcolor=#E9E9E9
| 339295 ||  || — || December 9, 2004 || Kitt Peak || Spacewatch || BRG || align=right | 1.7 km || 
|-id=296 bgcolor=#E9E9E9
| 339296 ||  || — || December 10, 2004 || Kitt Peak || Spacewatch || — || align=right | 1.4 km || 
|-id=297 bgcolor=#E9E9E9
| 339297 ||  || — || December 10, 2004 || Socorro || LINEAR || BRU || align=right | 4.2 km || 
|-id=298 bgcolor=#E9E9E9
| 339298 ||  || — || December 8, 2004 || Socorro || LINEAR || — || align=right | 2.8 km || 
|-id=299 bgcolor=#E9E9E9
| 339299 ||  || — || December 10, 2004 || Socorro || LINEAR || — || align=right | 1.2 km || 
|-id=300 bgcolor=#E9E9E9
| 339300 ||  || — || December 11, 2004 || Socorro || LINEAR || RAF || align=right | 1.5 km || 
|}

339301–339400 

|-bgcolor=#E9E9E9
| 339301 ||  || — || December 11, 2004 || Catalina || CSS || — || align=right | 1.6 km || 
|-id=302 bgcolor=#E9E9E9
| 339302 ||  || — || December 8, 2004 || Socorro || LINEAR || — || align=right | 1.1 km || 
|-id=303 bgcolor=#E9E9E9
| 339303 ||  || — || December 10, 2004 || Socorro || LINEAR || — || align=right | 1.5 km || 
|-id=304 bgcolor=#E9E9E9
| 339304 ||  || — || December 10, 2004 || Socorro || LINEAR || — || align=right | 1.9 km || 
|-id=305 bgcolor=#E9E9E9
| 339305 ||  || — || December 10, 2004 || Socorro || LINEAR || — || align=right | 1.3 km || 
|-id=306 bgcolor=#E9E9E9
| 339306 ||  || — || December 11, 2004 || Kitt Peak || Spacewatch || — || align=right | 1.5 km || 
|-id=307 bgcolor=#E9E9E9
| 339307 ||  || — || December 10, 2004 || Kitt Peak || Spacewatch || RAF || align=right | 1.5 km || 
|-id=308 bgcolor=#E9E9E9
| 339308 ||  || — || December 11, 2004 || Kitt Peak || Spacewatch || — || align=right | 1.5 km || 
|-id=309 bgcolor=#E9E9E9
| 339309 ||  || — || December 11, 2004 || Kitt Peak || Spacewatch || — || align=right | 1.2 km || 
|-id=310 bgcolor=#E9E9E9
| 339310 ||  || — || December 12, 2004 || Kitt Peak || Spacewatch || — || align=right | 1.8 km || 
|-id=311 bgcolor=#E9E9E9
| 339311 ||  || — || December 14, 2004 || Socorro || LINEAR || — || align=right | 1.0 km || 
|-id=312 bgcolor=#E9E9E9
| 339312 ||  || — || December 9, 2004 || Catalina || CSS || — || align=right | 1.6 km || 
|-id=313 bgcolor=#E9E9E9
| 339313 ||  || — || December 14, 2004 || Catalina || CSS || — || align=right | 2.6 km || 
|-id=314 bgcolor=#E9E9E9
| 339314 ||  || — || December 11, 2004 || Socorro || LINEAR || RAF || align=right | 1.1 km || 
|-id=315 bgcolor=#E9E9E9
| 339315 ||  || — || December 11, 2004 || Socorro || LINEAR || — || align=right | 1.5 km || 
|-id=316 bgcolor=#E9E9E9
| 339316 ||  || — || December 12, 2004 || Palomar || NEAT || — || align=right | 1.6 km || 
|-id=317 bgcolor=#E9E9E9
| 339317 ||  || — || December 14, 2004 || Catalina || CSS || — || align=right | 1.0 km || 
|-id=318 bgcolor=#E9E9E9
| 339318 ||  || — || December 10, 2004 || Kitt Peak || Spacewatch || EUN || align=right | 1.4 km || 
|-id=319 bgcolor=#E9E9E9
| 339319 ||  || — || December 10, 2004 || Kitt Peak || Spacewatch || EUN || align=right | 1.2 km || 
|-id=320 bgcolor=#E9E9E9
| 339320 ||  || — || December 11, 2004 || Kitt Peak || Spacewatch || — || align=right | 2.0 km || 
|-id=321 bgcolor=#E9E9E9
| 339321 ||  || — || December 12, 2004 || Kitt Peak || Spacewatch || — || align=right | 2.5 km || 
|-id=322 bgcolor=#E9E9E9
| 339322 ||  || — || December 15, 2004 || Kitt Peak || Spacewatch || — || align=right | 1.5 km || 
|-id=323 bgcolor=#E9E9E9
| 339323 ||  || — || December 14, 2004 || Socorro || LINEAR || — || align=right | 3.6 km || 
|-id=324 bgcolor=#E9E9E9
| 339324 ||  || — || December 11, 2004 || Socorro || LINEAR || — || align=right | 1.4 km || 
|-id=325 bgcolor=#E9E9E9
| 339325 ||  || — || December 15, 2004 || Socorro || LINEAR || — || align=right | 1.5 km || 
|-id=326 bgcolor=#E9E9E9
| 339326 ||  || — || November 20, 2004 || Kitt Peak || Spacewatch || — || align=right | 1.0 km || 
|-id=327 bgcolor=#E9E9E9
| 339327 ||  || — || December 9, 2004 || Kitt Peak || Spacewatch || — || align=right | 1.3 km || 
|-id=328 bgcolor=#E9E9E9
| 339328 ||  || — || December 1, 2004 || Catalina || CSS || — || align=right | 2.0 km || 
|-id=329 bgcolor=#E9E9E9
| 339329 ||  || — || December 2, 2004 || Socorro || LINEAR || — || align=right | 1.3 km || 
|-id=330 bgcolor=#E9E9E9
| 339330 ||  || — || December 10, 2004 || Kitt Peak || Spacewatch || AER || align=right | 1.6 km || 
|-id=331 bgcolor=#E9E9E9
| 339331 ||  || — || December 11, 2004 || Catalina || CSS || — || align=right | 1.1 km || 
|-id=332 bgcolor=#E9E9E9
| 339332 ||  || — || December 14, 2004 || Kitt Peak || Spacewatch || — || align=right | 1.0 km || 
|-id=333 bgcolor=#E9E9E9
| 339333 ||  || — || December 15, 2004 || Socorro || LINEAR || — || align=right | 1.3 km || 
|-id=334 bgcolor=#FA8072
| 339334 ||  || — || December 9, 2004 || Socorro || LINEAR || H || align=right data-sort-value="0.85" | 850 m || 
|-id=335 bgcolor=#E9E9E9
| 339335 ||  || — || December 17, 2004 || Socorro || LINEAR || — || align=right | 1.4 km || 
|-id=336 bgcolor=#E9E9E9
| 339336 ||  || — || December 19, 2004 || Mount Lemmon || Mount Lemmon Survey || — || align=right | 1.6 km || 
|-id=337 bgcolor=#E9E9E9
| 339337 ||  || — || December 18, 2004 || Mount Lemmon || Mount Lemmon Survey || WIT || align=right | 1.0 km || 
|-id=338 bgcolor=#E9E9E9
| 339338 ||  || — || December 18, 2004 || Socorro || LINEAR || — || align=right | 1.3 km || 
|-id=339 bgcolor=#E9E9E9
| 339339 ||  || — || December 18, 2004 || Socorro || LINEAR || — || align=right | 1.6 km || 
|-id=340 bgcolor=#E9E9E9
| 339340 ||  || — || December 19, 2004 || Anderson Mesa || LONEOS || MAR || align=right | 1.6 km || 
|-id=341 bgcolor=#E9E9E9
| 339341 ||  || — || December 21, 2004 || Catalina || CSS || — || align=right | 2.1 km || 
|-id=342 bgcolor=#E9E9E9
| 339342 ||  || — || January 1, 2005 || Catalina || CSS || GER || align=right | 2.3 km || 
|-id=343 bgcolor=#E9E9E9
| 339343 ||  || — || January 6, 2005 || Catalina || CSS || — || align=right | 1.3 km || 
|-id=344 bgcolor=#E9E9E9
| 339344 ||  || — || January 6, 2005 || Catalina || CSS || — || align=right | 3.1 km || 
|-id=345 bgcolor=#E9E9E9
| 339345 ||  || — || January 6, 2005 || Catalina || CSS || — || align=right | 1.5 km || 
|-id=346 bgcolor=#E9E9E9
| 339346 ||  || — || January 6, 2005 || Socorro || LINEAR || — || align=right | 2.1 km || 
|-id=347 bgcolor=#E9E9E9
| 339347 ||  || — || January 6, 2005 || Catalina || CSS || — || align=right | 2.2 km || 
|-id=348 bgcolor=#E9E9E9
| 339348 ||  || — || January 6, 2005 || Catalina || CSS || — || align=right | 3.1 km || 
|-id=349 bgcolor=#E9E9E9
| 339349 ||  || — || January 6, 2005 || Catalina || CSS || JUN || align=right | 1.2 km || 
|-id=350 bgcolor=#E9E9E9
| 339350 ||  || — || January 6, 2005 || Catalina || CSS || — || align=right | 2.2 km || 
|-id=351 bgcolor=#E9E9E9
| 339351 ||  || — || January 8, 2005 || Pla D'Arguines || R. Ferrando || NEM || align=right | 2.3 km || 
|-id=352 bgcolor=#E9E9E9
| 339352 ||  || — || January 7, 2005 || Catalina || CSS || — || align=right | 2.8 km || 
|-id=353 bgcolor=#E9E9E9
| 339353 ||  || — || January 7, 2005 || Socorro || LINEAR || — || align=right | 1.8 km || 
|-id=354 bgcolor=#E9E9E9
| 339354 ||  || — || January 7, 2005 || Socorro || LINEAR || — || align=right | 2.3 km || 
|-id=355 bgcolor=#E9E9E9
| 339355 ||  || — || January 11, 2005 || Socorro || LINEAR || — || align=right | 2.2 km || 
|-id=356 bgcolor=#E9E9E9
| 339356 ||  || — || January 9, 2005 || Catalina || CSS || — || align=right | 2.9 km || 
|-id=357 bgcolor=#E9E9E9
| 339357 ||  || — || January 9, 2005 || Catalina || CSS || — || align=right | 2.5 km || 
|-id=358 bgcolor=#E9E9E9
| 339358 ||  || — || January 11, 2005 || Socorro || LINEAR || — || align=right | 1.9 km || 
|-id=359 bgcolor=#E9E9E9
| 339359 ||  || — || January 13, 2005 || Kitt Peak || Spacewatch || — || align=right | 1.4 km || 
|-id=360 bgcolor=#E9E9E9
| 339360 ||  || — || January 13, 2005 || Socorro || LINEAR || — || align=right | 2.1 km || 
|-id=361 bgcolor=#E9E9E9
| 339361 ||  || — || January 15, 2005 || Catalina || CSS || ADE || align=right | 2.4 km || 
|-id=362 bgcolor=#fefefe
| 339362 ||  || — || January 15, 2005 || Catalina || CSS || H || align=right data-sort-value="0.85" | 850 m || 
|-id=363 bgcolor=#E9E9E9
| 339363 ||  || — || January 15, 2005 || Socorro || LINEAR || — || align=right | 2.2 km || 
|-id=364 bgcolor=#E9E9E9
| 339364 ||  || — || January 15, 2005 || Kitt Peak || Spacewatch || — || align=right | 1.9 km || 
|-id=365 bgcolor=#E9E9E9
| 339365 ||  || — || January 15, 2005 || Kitt Peak || Spacewatch || — || align=right | 1.6 km || 
|-id=366 bgcolor=#E9E9E9
| 339366 ||  || — || January 15, 2005 || Kitt Peak || Spacewatch || — || align=right | 2.1 km || 
|-id=367 bgcolor=#E9E9E9
| 339367 ||  || — || January 15, 2005 || Socorro || LINEAR || JUN || align=right | 1.8 km || 
|-id=368 bgcolor=#E9E9E9
| 339368 ||  || — || January 11, 2005 || Socorro || LINEAR || — || align=right | 1.3 km || 
|-id=369 bgcolor=#C2FFFF
| 339369 ||  || — || January 13, 2005 || Kitt Peak || Spacewatch || L5 || align=right | 12 km || 
|-id=370 bgcolor=#E9E9E9
| 339370 ||  || — || January 15, 2005 || Socorro || LINEAR || — || align=right | 1.9 km || 
|-id=371 bgcolor=#E9E9E9
| 339371 ||  || — || January 15, 2005 || Catalina || CSS || — || align=right | 2.0 km || 
|-id=372 bgcolor=#E9E9E9
| 339372 ||  || — || January 15, 2005 || Socorro || LINEAR || — || align=right | 1.8 km || 
|-id=373 bgcolor=#E9E9E9
| 339373 ||  || — || January 15, 2005 || Kitt Peak || Spacewatch || — || align=right | 2.8 km || 
|-id=374 bgcolor=#E9E9E9
| 339374 ||  || — || January 13, 2005 || Kitt Peak || Spacewatch || — || align=right | 1.3 km || 
|-id=375 bgcolor=#E9E9E9
| 339375 ||  || — || January 13, 2005 || Kitt Peak || Spacewatch || — || align=right | 1.4 km || 
|-id=376 bgcolor=#E9E9E9
| 339376 ||  || — || January 13, 2005 || Kitt Peak || Spacewatch || — || align=right | 2.7 km || 
|-id=377 bgcolor=#E9E9E9
| 339377 ||  || — || January 13, 2005 || Socorro || LINEAR || — || align=right | 2.2 km || 
|-id=378 bgcolor=#E9E9E9
| 339378 ||  || — || January 13, 2005 || Kitt Peak || Spacewatch || — || align=right | 2.9 km || 
|-id=379 bgcolor=#E9E9E9
| 339379 ||  || — || January 15, 2005 || Anderson Mesa || LONEOS || — || align=right | 2.2 km || 
|-id=380 bgcolor=#C2FFFF
| 339380 ||  || — || January 15, 2005 || Kitt Peak || Spacewatch || L5 || align=right | 8.1 km || 
|-id=381 bgcolor=#fefefe
| 339381 ||  || — || January 15, 2005 || Kitt Peak || Spacewatch || H || align=right data-sort-value="0.58" | 580 m || 
|-id=382 bgcolor=#C2FFFF
| 339382 ||  || — || January 15, 2005 || Kitt Peak || Spacewatch || L5 || align=right | 9.8 km || 
|-id=383 bgcolor=#E9E9E9
| 339383 ||  || — || January 15, 2005 || Kitt Peak || Spacewatch || — || align=right | 1.3 km || 
|-id=384 bgcolor=#E9E9E9
| 339384 ||  || — || January 18, 2005 || Wrightwood || J. W. Young || — || align=right | 1.9 km || 
|-id=385 bgcolor=#E9E9E9
| 339385 ||  || — || January 19, 2005 || Wrightwood || J. W. Young || — || align=right | 1.5 km || 
|-id=386 bgcolor=#E9E9E9
| 339386 ||  || — || January 16, 2005 || Socorro || LINEAR || — || align=right | 1.3 km || 
|-id=387 bgcolor=#E9E9E9
| 339387 ||  || — || January 16, 2005 || Socorro || LINEAR || — || align=right | 2.4 km || 
|-id=388 bgcolor=#E9E9E9
| 339388 ||  || — || January 16, 2005 || Kitt Peak || Spacewatch || — || align=right | 1.8 km || 
|-id=389 bgcolor=#E9E9E9
| 339389 ||  || — || January 17, 2005 || Socorro || LINEAR || MIS || align=right | 2.8 km || 
|-id=390 bgcolor=#E9E9E9
| 339390 ||  || — || January 16, 2005 || Socorro || LINEAR || — || align=right | 2.7 km || 
|-id=391 bgcolor=#E9E9E9
| 339391 ||  || — || January 16, 2005 || Socorro || LINEAR || — || align=right | 3.0 km || 
|-id=392 bgcolor=#E9E9E9
| 339392 ||  || — || January 17, 2005 || Socorro || LINEAR || — || align=right | 1.7 km || 
|-id=393 bgcolor=#E9E9E9
| 339393 ||  || — || January 31, 2005 || Goodricke-Pigott || R. A. Tucker || — || align=right | 3.4 km || 
|-id=394 bgcolor=#E9E9E9
| 339394 ||  || — || January 31, 2005 || Mayhill || A. Lowe || NEM || align=right | 2.6 km || 
|-id=395 bgcolor=#E9E9E9
| 339395 ||  || — || January 16, 2005 || Mauna Kea || P. A. Wiegert || — || align=right | 1.7 km || 
|-id=396 bgcolor=#E9E9E9
| 339396 ||  || — || January 17, 2005 || Kitt Peak || Spacewatch || — || align=right | 1.2 km || 
|-id=397 bgcolor=#E9E9E9
| 339397 ||  || — || January 16, 2005 || Catalina || CSS || — || align=right | 2.0 km || 
|-id=398 bgcolor=#E9E9E9
| 339398 ||  || — || February 1, 2005 || Catalina || CSS || JUN || align=right | 1.5 km || 
|-id=399 bgcolor=#E9E9E9
| 339399 ||  || — || February 1, 2005 || Kitt Peak || Spacewatch || NEM || align=right | 2.7 km || 
|-id=400 bgcolor=#E9E9E9
| 339400 ||  || — || February 1, 2005 || Kitt Peak || Spacewatch || — || align=right | 2.6 km || 
|}

339401–339500 

|-bgcolor=#E9E9E9
| 339401 ||  || — || February 1, 2005 || Palomar || NEAT || — || align=right | 2.0 km || 
|-id=402 bgcolor=#E9E9E9
| 339402 ||  || — || February 2, 2005 || Kitt Peak || Spacewatch || — || align=right | 1.9 km || 
|-id=403 bgcolor=#E9E9E9
| 339403 ||  || — || February 2, 2005 || Kitt Peak || Spacewatch || HOF || align=right | 2.5 km || 
|-id=404 bgcolor=#E9E9E9
| 339404 ||  || — || February 2, 2005 || Catalina || CSS || — || align=right | 2.0 km || 
|-id=405 bgcolor=#E9E9E9
| 339405 ||  || — || February 3, 2005 || Socorro || LINEAR || — || align=right | 2.1 km || 
|-id=406 bgcolor=#d6d6d6
| 339406 ||  || — || February 2, 2005 || Kitt Peak || Spacewatch || KAR || align=right | 1.3 km || 
|-id=407 bgcolor=#E9E9E9
| 339407 ||  || — || February 2, 2005 || Socorro || LINEAR || — || align=right | 3.1 km || 
|-id=408 bgcolor=#E9E9E9
| 339408 ||  || — || February 2, 2005 || Socorro || LINEAR || — || align=right | 1.4 km || 
|-id=409 bgcolor=#E9E9E9
| 339409 ||  || — || February 3, 2005 || Socorro || LINEAR || INO || align=right | 1.3 km || 
|-id=410 bgcolor=#E9E9E9
| 339410 ||  || — || February 2, 2005 || Socorro || LINEAR || HNS || align=right | 1.6 km || 
|-id=411 bgcolor=#E9E9E9
| 339411 ||  || — || February 2, 2005 || Socorro || LINEAR || — || align=right | 2.7 km || 
|-id=412 bgcolor=#E9E9E9
| 339412 ||  || — || February 2, 2005 || Catalina || CSS || — || align=right | 2.1 km || 
|-id=413 bgcolor=#E9E9E9
| 339413 ||  || — || February 9, 2005 || Anderson Mesa || LONEOS || CLO || align=right | 2.3 km || 
|-id=414 bgcolor=#E9E9E9
| 339414 ||  || — || February 9, 2005 || Mount Lemmon || Mount Lemmon Survey || — || align=right | 2.3 km || 
|-id=415 bgcolor=#E9E9E9
| 339415 ||  || — || February 9, 2005 || Mount Lemmon || Mount Lemmon Survey || — || align=right | 2.0 km || 
|-id=416 bgcolor=#E9E9E9
| 339416 ||  || — || February 8, 2005 || Mauna Kea || C. Veillet || WIT || align=right data-sort-value="0.99" | 990 m || 
|-id=417 bgcolor=#E9E9E9
| 339417 ||  || — || March 1, 2005 || Kitt Peak || Spacewatch || — || align=right | 3.3 km || 
|-id=418 bgcolor=#E9E9E9
| 339418 ||  || — || March 1, 2005 || Kitt Peak || Spacewatch || — || align=right | 2.7 km || 
|-id=419 bgcolor=#d6d6d6
| 339419 ||  || — || March 1, 2005 || Kitt Peak || Spacewatch || — || align=right | 3.1 km || 
|-id=420 bgcolor=#d6d6d6
| 339420 ||  || — || March 3, 2005 || Catalina || CSS || — || align=right | 3.7 km || 
|-id=421 bgcolor=#E9E9E9
| 339421 ||  || — || March 2, 2005 || Catalina || CSS || — || align=right | 1.5 km || 
|-id=422 bgcolor=#E9E9E9
| 339422 ||  || — || March 3, 2005 || Catalina || CSS || — || align=right | 3.0 km || 
|-id=423 bgcolor=#E9E9E9
| 339423 ||  || — || March 3, 2005 || Catalina || CSS || — || align=right | 3.3 km || 
|-id=424 bgcolor=#E9E9E9
| 339424 ||  || — || March 4, 2005 || Catalina || CSS || CLO || align=right | 1.8 km || 
|-id=425 bgcolor=#E9E9E9
| 339425 ||  || — || March 4, 2005 || Mount Lemmon || Mount Lemmon Survey || — || align=right | 2.2 km || 
|-id=426 bgcolor=#E9E9E9
| 339426 ||  || — || March 3, 2005 || Catalina || CSS || — || align=right | 3.0 km || 
|-id=427 bgcolor=#E9E9E9
| 339427 ||  || — || March 4, 2005 || Kitt Peak || Spacewatch || — || align=right | 2.7 km || 
|-id=428 bgcolor=#E9E9E9
| 339428 ||  || — || March 4, 2005 || Kitt Peak || Spacewatch || — || align=right | 2.8 km || 
|-id=429 bgcolor=#E9E9E9
| 339429 ||  || — || March 4, 2005 || Kitt Peak || Spacewatch || — || align=right | 3.6 km || 
|-id=430 bgcolor=#E9E9E9
| 339430 ||  || — || March 4, 2005 || Catalina || CSS || — || align=right | 4.1 km || 
|-id=431 bgcolor=#E9E9E9
| 339431 ||  || — || March 4, 2005 || Socorro || LINEAR || — || align=right | 2.1 km || 
|-id=432 bgcolor=#E9E9E9
| 339432 ||  || — || March 4, 2005 || Socorro || LINEAR || DOR || align=right | 3.2 km || 
|-id=433 bgcolor=#d6d6d6
| 339433 ||  || — || March 7, 2005 || Socorro || LINEAR || — || align=right | 4.3 km || 
|-id=434 bgcolor=#E9E9E9
| 339434 ||  || — || March 8, 2005 || Socorro || LINEAR || — || align=right | 2.2 km || 
|-id=435 bgcolor=#E9E9E9
| 339435 ||  || — || March 8, 2005 || Socorro || LINEAR || — || align=right | 2.9 km || 
|-id=436 bgcolor=#d6d6d6
| 339436 ||  || — || March 3, 2005 || Catalina || CSS || — || align=right | 3.1 km || 
|-id=437 bgcolor=#E9E9E9
| 339437 ||  || — || March 9, 2005 || Kitt Peak || Spacewatch || HNA || align=right | 2.9 km || 
|-id=438 bgcolor=#E9E9E9
| 339438 ||  || — || March 9, 2005 || Catalina || CSS || — || align=right | 3.3 km || 
|-id=439 bgcolor=#d6d6d6
| 339439 ||  || — || March 10, 2005 || Mount Lemmon || Mount Lemmon Survey || — || align=right | 2.2 km || 
|-id=440 bgcolor=#d6d6d6
| 339440 ||  || — || March 10, 2005 || Kitt Peak || Spacewatch || — || align=right | 4.2 km || 
|-id=441 bgcolor=#d6d6d6
| 339441 ||  || — || March 8, 2005 || Anderson Mesa || LONEOS || — || align=right | 3.6 km || 
|-id=442 bgcolor=#d6d6d6
| 339442 ||  || — || March 8, 2005 || Mount Lemmon || Mount Lemmon Survey || THM || align=right | 2.6 km || 
|-id=443 bgcolor=#d6d6d6
| 339443 ||  || — || March 9, 2005 || Mount Lemmon || Mount Lemmon Survey || KOR || align=right | 1.5 km || 
|-id=444 bgcolor=#d6d6d6
| 339444 ||  || — || March 9, 2005 || Mount Lemmon || Mount Lemmon Survey || KOR || align=right | 1.6 km || 
|-id=445 bgcolor=#d6d6d6
| 339445 ||  || — || March 10, 2005 || Mount Lemmon || Mount Lemmon Survey || — || align=right | 3.2 km || 
|-id=446 bgcolor=#d6d6d6
| 339446 ||  || — || March 11, 2005 || Mount Lemmon || Mount Lemmon Survey || — || align=right | 2.2 km || 
|-id=447 bgcolor=#d6d6d6
| 339447 ||  || — || March 9, 2005 || Kitt Peak || Spacewatch || KAR || align=right | 1.4 km || 
|-id=448 bgcolor=#d6d6d6
| 339448 ||  || — || March 10, 2005 || Mount Lemmon || Mount Lemmon Survey || — || align=right | 2.7 km || 
|-id=449 bgcolor=#E9E9E9
| 339449 ||  || — || March 11, 2005 || Kitt Peak || Spacewatch || — || align=right | 3.2 km || 
|-id=450 bgcolor=#E9E9E9
| 339450 ||  || — || March 11, 2005 || Mount Lemmon || Mount Lemmon Survey || AGN || align=right | 1.3 km || 
|-id=451 bgcolor=#d6d6d6
| 339451 ||  || — || March 11, 2005 || Mount Lemmon || Mount Lemmon Survey || — || align=right | 2.2 km || 
|-id=452 bgcolor=#d6d6d6
| 339452 ||  || — || March 11, 2005 || Mount Lemmon || Mount Lemmon Survey || KOR || align=right | 1.5 km || 
|-id=453 bgcolor=#d6d6d6
| 339453 ||  || — || March 11, 2005 || Mount Lemmon || Mount Lemmon Survey || — || align=right | 2.4 km || 
|-id=454 bgcolor=#d6d6d6
| 339454 ||  || — || March 11, 2005 || Mount Lemmon || Mount Lemmon Survey || KOR || align=right | 2.0 km || 
|-id=455 bgcolor=#d6d6d6
| 339455 ||  || — || March 11, 2005 || Mount Lemmon || Mount Lemmon Survey || CHA || align=right | 2.2 km || 
|-id=456 bgcolor=#d6d6d6
| 339456 ||  || — || March 11, 2005 || Mount Lemmon || Mount Lemmon Survey || NAE || align=right | 2.8 km || 
|-id=457 bgcolor=#E9E9E9
| 339457 ||  || — || March 8, 2005 || Socorro || LINEAR || — || align=right | 2.4 km || 
|-id=458 bgcolor=#d6d6d6
| 339458 ||  || — || March 13, 2005 || Kitt Peak || Spacewatch || — || align=right | 3.9 km || 
|-id=459 bgcolor=#E9E9E9
| 339459 ||  || — || March 4, 2005 || Kitt Peak || Spacewatch || — || align=right | 2.2 km || 
|-id=460 bgcolor=#E9E9E9
| 339460 ||  || — || March 4, 2005 || Kitt Peak || Spacewatch || — || align=right | 1.9 km || 
|-id=461 bgcolor=#d6d6d6
| 339461 ||  || — || March 10, 2005 || Mount Lemmon || Mount Lemmon Survey || — || align=right | 3.0 km || 
|-id=462 bgcolor=#d6d6d6
| 339462 ||  || — || March 10, 2005 || Anderson Mesa || LONEOS || EUP || align=right | 4.6 km || 
|-id=463 bgcolor=#E9E9E9
| 339463 ||  || — || March 10, 2005 || Mount Lemmon || Mount Lemmon Survey || — || align=right | 2.0 km || 
|-id=464 bgcolor=#E9E9E9
| 339464 ||  || — || March 10, 2005 || Mount Lemmon || Mount Lemmon Survey || — || align=right | 2.4 km || 
|-id=465 bgcolor=#d6d6d6
| 339465 ||  || — || March 11, 2005 || Kitt Peak || Spacewatch || K-2 || align=right | 1.9 km || 
|-id=466 bgcolor=#E9E9E9
| 339466 ||  || — || March 11, 2005 || Catalina || CSS || — || align=right | 3.1 km || 
|-id=467 bgcolor=#d6d6d6
| 339467 ||  || — || March 11, 2005 || Kitt Peak || Spacewatch || EOS || align=right | 2.3 km || 
|-id=468 bgcolor=#E9E9E9
| 339468 ||  || — || March 11, 2005 || Anderson Mesa || LONEOS || JUN || align=right | 1.6 km || 
|-id=469 bgcolor=#d6d6d6
| 339469 ||  || — || March 3, 2005 || Kitt Peak || Spacewatch || — || align=right | 2.7 km || 
|-id=470 bgcolor=#E9E9E9
| 339470 ||  || — || March 14, 2005 || Catalina || CSS || — || align=right | 2.2 km || 
|-id=471 bgcolor=#d6d6d6
| 339471 ||  || — || March 10, 2005 || Mount Lemmon || Mount Lemmon Survey || — || align=right | 3.0 km || 
|-id=472 bgcolor=#d6d6d6
| 339472 ||  || — || March 11, 2005 || Mount Lemmon || Mount Lemmon Survey || — || align=right | 3.5 km || 
|-id=473 bgcolor=#d6d6d6
| 339473 ||  || — || March 13, 2005 || Kitt Peak || Spacewatch || — || align=right | 2.3 km || 
|-id=474 bgcolor=#d6d6d6
| 339474 ||  || — || March 11, 2005 || Kitt Peak || Spacewatch || KAR || align=right | 1.7 km || 
|-id=475 bgcolor=#E9E9E9
| 339475 ||  || — || March 7, 2005 || Socorro || LINEAR || JUN || align=right | 1.4 km || 
|-id=476 bgcolor=#d6d6d6
| 339476 ||  || — || March 12, 2005 || Socorro || LINEAR || KAR || align=right | 2.0 km || 
|-id=477 bgcolor=#d6d6d6
| 339477 ||  || — || March 11, 2005 || Kitt Peak || M. W. Buie || EOS || align=right | 2.9 km || 
|-id=478 bgcolor=#E9E9E9
| 339478 ||  || — || March 11, 2005 || Kitt Peak || Spacewatch || — || align=right | 1.3 km || 
|-id=479 bgcolor=#d6d6d6
| 339479 ||  || — || March 11, 2005 || Kitt Peak || M. W. Buie || KOR || align=right | 1.7 km || 
|-id=480 bgcolor=#E9E9E9
| 339480 ||  || — || March 11, 2005 || Mount Lemmon || Mount Lemmon Survey || — || align=right | 1.7 km || 
|-id=481 bgcolor=#d6d6d6
| 339481 ||  || — || March 9, 2005 || Anderson Mesa || LONEOS || — || align=right | 3.6 km || 
|-id=482 bgcolor=#d6d6d6
| 339482 ||  || — || March 21, 2005 || Goodricke-Pigott || R. A. Tucker || Tj (2.99) || align=right | 4.5 km || 
|-id=483 bgcolor=#E9E9E9
| 339483 ||  || — || March 16, 2005 || Mount Lemmon || Mount Lemmon Survey || — || align=right | 2.2 km || 
|-id=484 bgcolor=#E9E9E9
| 339484 ||  || — || March 31, 2005 || Anderson Mesa || LONEOS || — || align=right | 2.4 km || 
|-id=485 bgcolor=#d6d6d6
| 339485 ||  || — || April 1, 2005 || Kitt Peak || Spacewatch || — || align=right | 3.0 km || 
|-id=486 bgcolor=#d6d6d6
| 339486 Raimeux ||  ||  || April 3, 2005 || Vicques || M. Ory || — || align=right | 2.5 km || 
|-id=487 bgcolor=#d6d6d6
| 339487 ||  || — || April 1, 2005 || Kitt Peak || Spacewatch || — || align=right | 2.6 km || 
|-id=488 bgcolor=#d6d6d6
| 339488 ||  || — || April 1, 2005 || Kitt Peak || Spacewatch || — || align=right | 3.6 km || 
|-id=489 bgcolor=#d6d6d6
| 339489 ||  || — || April 1, 2005 || Kitt Peak || Spacewatch || EOS || align=right | 5.7 km || 
|-id=490 bgcolor=#d6d6d6
| 339490 ||  || — || April 2, 2005 || Kitt Peak || Spacewatch || — || align=right | 3.9 km || 
|-id=491 bgcolor=#d6d6d6
| 339491 ||  || — || April 2, 2005 || Mount Lemmon || Mount Lemmon Survey || — || align=right | 3.4 km || 
|-id=492 bgcolor=#FFC2E0
| 339492 ||  || — || April 4, 2005 || Socorro || LINEAR || AMO +1km || align=right data-sort-value="0.81" | 810 m || 
|-id=493 bgcolor=#E9E9E9
| 339493 ||  || — || April 2, 2005 || Mount Lemmon || Mount Lemmon Survey || XIZ || align=right | 1.4 km || 
|-id=494 bgcolor=#E9E9E9
| 339494 ||  || — || April 1, 2005 || Anderson Mesa || LONEOS || — || align=right | 2.0 km || 
|-id=495 bgcolor=#fefefe
| 339495 ||  || — || April 2, 2005 || Anderson Mesa || LONEOS || H || align=right data-sort-value="0.86" | 860 m || 
|-id=496 bgcolor=#E9E9E9
| 339496 ||  || — || April 2, 2005 || Mount Lemmon || Mount Lemmon Survey || — || align=right | 2.0 km || 
|-id=497 bgcolor=#d6d6d6
| 339497 ||  || — || April 2, 2005 || Mount Lemmon || Mount Lemmon Survey || KOR || align=right | 1.3 km || 
|-id=498 bgcolor=#d6d6d6
| 339498 ||  || — || April 4, 2005 || Mount Lemmon || Mount Lemmon Survey || — || align=right | 2.8 km || 
|-id=499 bgcolor=#d6d6d6
| 339499 ||  || — || April 5, 2005 || Mount Lemmon || Mount Lemmon Survey || EOS || align=right | 2.2 km || 
|-id=500 bgcolor=#d6d6d6
| 339500 ||  || — || April 2, 2005 || Mount Lemmon || Mount Lemmon Survey || — || align=right | 3.4 km || 
|}

339501–339600 

|-bgcolor=#E9E9E9
| 339501 ||  || — || April 6, 2005 || Anderson Mesa || LONEOS || JUN || align=right | 1.7 km || 
|-id=502 bgcolor=#d6d6d6
| 339502 ||  || — || April 2, 2005 || Anderson Mesa || LONEOS || TIR || align=right | 3.0 km || 
|-id=503 bgcolor=#d6d6d6
| 339503 ||  || — || April 5, 2005 || Vail-Jarnac || Jarnac Obs. || — || align=right | 5.0 km || 
|-id=504 bgcolor=#d6d6d6
| 339504 ||  || — || April 2, 2005 || Palomar || NEAT || — || align=right | 3.1 km || 
|-id=505 bgcolor=#d6d6d6
| 339505 ||  || — || April 3, 2005 || Palomar || NEAT || — || align=right | 4.6 km || 
|-id=506 bgcolor=#d6d6d6
| 339506 ||  || — || April 4, 2005 || Kitt Peak || Spacewatch || — || align=right | 3.0 km || 
|-id=507 bgcolor=#d6d6d6
| 339507 ||  || — || April 7, 2005 || Kitt Peak || Spacewatch || — || align=right | 2.8 km || 
|-id=508 bgcolor=#d6d6d6
| 339508 ||  || — || April 9, 2005 || Kitt Peak || Spacewatch || EOS || align=right | 2.0 km || 
|-id=509 bgcolor=#d6d6d6
| 339509 ||  || — || April 9, 2005 || Kitt Peak || Spacewatch || — || align=right | 3.5 km || 
|-id=510 bgcolor=#d6d6d6
| 339510 ||  || — || April 9, 2005 || Kitt Peak || Spacewatch || VER || align=right | 4.8 km || 
|-id=511 bgcolor=#E9E9E9
| 339511 ||  || — || April 10, 2005 || Mount Lemmon || Mount Lemmon Survey || — || align=right | 2.4 km || 
|-id=512 bgcolor=#d6d6d6
| 339512 ||  || — || April 10, 2005 || Mount Lemmon || Mount Lemmon Survey || KAR || align=right | 1.3 km || 
|-id=513 bgcolor=#d6d6d6
| 339513 ||  || — || April 6, 2005 || Catalina || CSS || EUP || align=right | 3.9 km || 
|-id=514 bgcolor=#d6d6d6
| 339514 ||  || — || April 9, 2005 || Socorro || LINEAR || Tj (2.95) || align=right | 5.0 km || 
|-id=515 bgcolor=#d6d6d6
| 339515 ||  || — || September 11, 2001 || Kitt Peak || Spacewatch || — || align=right | 2.8 km || 
|-id=516 bgcolor=#d6d6d6
| 339516 ||  || — || April 10, 2005 || Kitt Peak || Spacewatch || — || align=right | 3.0 km || 
|-id=517 bgcolor=#d6d6d6
| 339517 ||  || — || April 10, 2005 || Kitt Peak || Spacewatch || ARM || align=right | 4.3 km || 
|-id=518 bgcolor=#d6d6d6
| 339518 ||  || — || April 12, 2005 || Mount Lemmon || Mount Lemmon Survey || — || align=right | 2.3 km || 
|-id=519 bgcolor=#d6d6d6
| 339519 ||  || — || April 9, 2005 || Socorro || LINEAR || — || align=right | 4.1 km || 
|-id=520 bgcolor=#d6d6d6
| 339520 ||  || — || April 10, 2005 || Mount Lemmon || Mount Lemmon Survey || — || align=right | 3.1 km || 
|-id=521 bgcolor=#d6d6d6
| 339521 ||  || — || April 11, 2005 || Mount Lemmon || Mount Lemmon Survey || — || align=right | 4.1 km || 
|-id=522 bgcolor=#d6d6d6
| 339522 ||  || — || April 12, 2005 || Kitt Peak || Spacewatch || HYG || align=right | 3.3 km || 
|-id=523 bgcolor=#d6d6d6
| 339523 ||  || — || April 14, 2005 || Kitt Peak || Spacewatch || 628 || align=right | 2.5 km || 
|-id=524 bgcolor=#d6d6d6
| 339524 ||  || — || April 14, 2005 || Kitt Peak || Spacewatch || EOS || align=right | 2.0 km || 
|-id=525 bgcolor=#d6d6d6
| 339525 ||  || — || December 18, 2003 || Kitt Peak || Spacewatch || — || align=right | 2.4 km || 
|-id=526 bgcolor=#d6d6d6
| 339526 ||  || — || March 8, 2005 || Mount Lemmon || Mount Lemmon Survey || — || align=right | 4.8 km || 
|-id=527 bgcolor=#E9E9E9
| 339527 ||  || — || October 16, 2003 || Kitt Peak || Spacewatch || — || align=right | 3.2 km || 
|-id=528 bgcolor=#d6d6d6
| 339528 ||  || — || April 14, 2005 || Kitt Peak || Spacewatch || EOS || align=right | 2.3 km || 
|-id=529 bgcolor=#d6d6d6
| 339529 ||  || — || April 6, 2005 || Anderson Mesa || LONEOS || — || align=right | 3.0 km || 
|-id=530 bgcolor=#d6d6d6
| 339530 ||  || — || April 16, 2005 || Kitt Peak || Spacewatch || — || align=right | 4.9 km || 
|-id=531 bgcolor=#fefefe
| 339531 ||  || — || April 30, 2005 || Kitt Peak || Spacewatch || FLO || align=right data-sort-value="0.57" | 570 m || 
|-id=532 bgcolor=#d6d6d6
| 339532 ||  || — || May 1, 2005 || Siding Spring || SSS || — || align=right | 3.8 km || 
|-id=533 bgcolor=#d6d6d6
| 339533 ||  || — || May 3, 2005 || Catalina || CSS || — || align=right | 5.0 km || 
|-id=534 bgcolor=#d6d6d6
| 339534 ||  || — || May 1, 2005 || Palomar || NEAT || EUP || align=right | 3.8 km || 
|-id=535 bgcolor=#d6d6d6
| 339535 ||  || — || May 2, 2005 || Kitt Peak || Spacewatch || — || align=right | 3.0 km || 
|-id=536 bgcolor=#d6d6d6
| 339536 ||  || — || May 3, 2005 || Kitt Peak || Spacewatch || HYG || align=right | 2.8 km || 
|-id=537 bgcolor=#d6d6d6
| 339537 ||  || — || May 4, 2005 || Kitt Peak || Spacewatch || — || align=right | 4.2 km || 
|-id=538 bgcolor=#d6d6d6
| 339538 ||  || — || May 3, 2005 || Kitt Peak || Spacewatch || — || align=right | 2.9 km || 
|-id=539 bgcolor=#d6d6d6
| 339539 ||  || — || May 3, 2005 || Kitt Peak || Spacewatch || EOS || align=right | 2.2 km || 
|-id=540 bgcolor=#d6d6d6
| 339540 ||  || — || May 4, 2005 || Kitt Peak || Spacewatch || — || align=right | 2.9 km || 
|-id=541 bgcolor=#d6d6d6
| 339541 ||  || — || May 4, 2005 || Kitt Peak || Spacewatch || — || align=right | 2.8 km || 
|-id=542 bgcolor=#E9E9E9
| 339542 ||  || — || May 8, 2005 || Mount Lemmon || Mount Lemmon Survey || — || align=right | 2.9 km || 
|-id=543 bgcolor=#d6d6d6
| 339543 ||  || — || May 8, 2005 || Mount Lemmon || Mount Lemmon Survey || — || align=right | 3.2 km || 
|-id=544 bgcolor=#d6d6d6
| 339544 ||  || — || May 9, 2005 || Socorro || LINEAR || — || align=right | 3.2 km || 
|-id=545 bgcolor=#d6d6d6
| 339545 ||  || — || April 16, 2005 || Kitt Peak || Spacewatch || URS || align=right | 3.2 km || 
|-id=546 bgcolor=#d6d6d6
| 339546 ||  || — || May 8, 2005 || Kitt Peak || Spacewatch || EOS || align=right | 2.1 km || 
|-id=547 bgcolor=#d6d6d6
| 339547 ||  || — || May 8, 2005 || Kitt Peak || Spacewatch || — || align=right | 3.3 km || 
|-id=548 bgcolor=#fefefe
| 339548 ||  || — || May 10, 2005 || Kitt Peak || Spacewatch || — || align=right data-sort-value="0.59" | 590 m || 
|-id=549 bgcolor=#d6d6d6
| 339549 ||  || — || May 11, 2005 || Palomar || NEAT || — || align=right | 3.6 km || 
|-id=550 bgcolor=#d6d6d6
| 339550 ||  || — || May 7, 2005 || Mount Lemmon || Mount Lemmon Survey || — || align=right | 2.7 km || 
|-id=551 bgcolor=#d6d6d6
| 339551 ||  || — || May 10, 2005 || Mount Lemmon || Mount Lemmon Survey || THM || align=right | 2.4 km || 
|-id=552 bgcolor=#d6d6d6
| 339552 ||  || — || May 11, 2005 || Mount Lemmon || Mount Lemmon Survey || — || align=right | 2.7 km || 
|-id=553 bgcolor=#d6d6d6
| 339553 ||  || — || May 11, 2005 || Mount Lemmon || Mount Lemmon Survey || EOS || align=right | 2.4 km || 
|-id=554 bgcolor=#d6d6d6
| 339554 ||  || — || April 17, 2005 || Kitt Peak || Spacewatch || — || align=right | 4.7 km || 
|-id=555 bgcolor=#d6d6d6
| 339555 ||  || — || May 9, 2005 || Catalina || CSS || — || align=right | 4.0 km || 
|-id=556 bgcolor=#d6d6d6
| 339556 ||  || — || May 10, 2005 || Kitt Peak || Spacewatch || EOS || align=right | 2.8 km || 
|-id=557 bgcolor=#d6d6d6
| 339557 ||  || — || May 12, 2005 || Mount Lemmon || Mount Lemmon Survey || — || align=right | 3.6 km || 
|-id=558 bgcolor=#d6d6d6
| 339558 ||  || — || May 11, 2005 || Catalina || CSS || — || align=right | 4.0 km || 
|-id=559 bgcolor=#d6d6d6
| 339559 ||  || — || May 13, 2005 || Mount Lemmon || Mount Lemmon Survey || TIR || align=right | 3.4 km || 
|-id=560 bgcolor=#fefefe
| 339560 ||  || — || May 15, 2005 || Mount Lemmon || Mount Lemmon Survey || — || align=right data-sort-value="0.61" | 610 m || 
|-id=561 bgcolor=#fefefe
| 339561 ||  || — || May 3, 2005 || Kitt Peak || Spacewatch || — || align=right data-sort-value="0.59" | 590 m || 
|-id=562 bgcolor=#C2FFFF
| 339562 ||  || — || May 8, 2005 || Kitt Peak || Spacewatch || L4 || align=right | 10 km || 
|-id=563 bgcolor=#d6d6d6
| 339563 ||  || — || May 9, 2005 || Cerro Tololo || M. W. Buie || KOR || align=right | 1.3 km || 
|-id=564 bgcolor=#d6d6d6
| 339564 ||  || — || May 16, 2005 || Mount Lemmon || Mount Lemmon Survey || — || align=right | 3.4 km || 
|-id=565 bgcolor=#d6d6d6
| 339565 ||  || — || May 17, 2005 || Mount Lemmon || Mount Lemmon Survey || — || align=right | 3.7 km || 
|-id=566 bgcolor=#d6d6d6
| 339566 ||  || — || May 20, 2005 || Mount Lemmon || Mount Lemmon Survey || — || align=right | 3.0 km || 
|-id=567 bgcolor=#d6d6d6
| 339567 ||  || — || June 1, 2005 || Kitt Peak || Spacewatch || — || align=right | 6.1 km || 
|-id=568 bgcolor=#d6d6d6
| 339568 ||  || — || June 1, 2005 || Kitt Peak || Spacewatch || — || align=right | 2.9 km || 
|-id=569 bgcolor=#d6d6d6
| 339569 ||  || — || June 4, 2005 || Socorro || LINEAR || EUP || align=right | 3.9 km || 
|-id=570 bgcolor=#d6d6d6
| 339570 ||  || — || June 1, 2005 || Kitt Peak || Spacewatch || TIR || align=right | 4.4 km || 
|-id=571 bgcolor=#d6d6d6
| 339571 ||  || — || June 4, 2005 || Kitt Peak || Spacewatch || — || align=right | 3.5 km || 
|-id=572 bgcolor=#d6d6d6
| 339572 ||  || — || June 8, 2005 || Kitt Peak || Spacewatch || — || align=right | 3.4 km || 
|-id=573 bgcolor=#d6d6d6
| 339573 ||  || — || June 6, 2005 || Kitt Peak || Spacewatch || — || align=right | 3.7 km || 
|-id=574 bgcolor=#d6d6d6
| 339574 ||  || — || June 10, 2005 || Kitt Peak || Spacewatch || — || align=right | 2.9 km || 
|-id=575 bgcolor=#d6d6d6
| 339575 ||  || — || June 8, 2005 || Kitt Peak || Spacewatch || EOS || align=right | 2.3 km || 
|-id=576 bgcolor=#fefefe
| 339576 ||  || — || June 8, 2005 || Kitt Peak || Spacewatch || — || align=right data-sort-value="0.76" | 760 m || 
|-id=577 bgcolor=#d6d6d6
| 339577 ||  || — || June 11, 2005 || Kitt Peak || Spacewatch || — || align=right | 5.0 km || 
|-id=578 bgcolor=#fefefe
| 339578 ||  || — || June 13, 2005 || Mount Lemmon || Mount Lemmon Survey || FLO || align=right data-sort-value="0.65" | 650 m || 
|-id=579 bgcolor=#d6d6d6
| 339579 ||  || — || June 28, 2005 || Kitt Peak || Spacewatch || TIR || align=right | 3.4 km || 
|-id=580 bgcolor=#FA8072
| 339580 ||  || — || June 29, 2005 || Palomar || NEAT || — || align=right | 1.2 km || 
|-id=581 bgcolor=#d6d6d6
| 339581 ||  || — || June 29, 2005 || Kitt Peak || Spacewatch || EOS || align=right | 2.2 km || 
|-id=582 bgcolor=#d6d6d6
| 339582 ||  || — || June 29, 2005 || Kitt Peak || Spacewatch || — || align=right | 4.1 km || 
|-id=583 bgcolor=#fefefe
| 339583 ||  || — || June 30, 2005 || Catalina || CSS || — || align=right | 1.1 km || 
|-id=584 bgcolor=#fefefe
| 339584 ||  || — || June 30, 2005 || Socorro || LINEAR || PHO || align=right | 1.4 km || 
|-id=585 bgcolor=#d6d6d6
| 339585 ||  || — || June 30, 2005 || Kitt Peak || Spacewatch || VER || align=right | 3.5 km || 
|-id=586 bgcolor=#fefefe
| 339586 ||  || — || June 28, 2005 || Palomar || NEAT || — || align=right | 1.3 km || 
|-id=587 bgcolor=#fefefe
| 339587 ||  || — || June 30, 2005 || Kitt Peak || Spacewatch || — || align=right data-sort-value="0.75" | 750 m || 
|-id=588 bgcolor=#fefefe
| 339588 ||  || — || June 30, 2005 || Kitt Peak || Spacewatch || FLO || align=right data-sort-value="0.73" | 730 m || 
|-id=589 bgcolor=#fefefe
| 339589 ||  || — || June 30, 2005 || Kitt Peak || Spacewatch || — || align=right data-sort-value="0.70" | 700 m || 
|-id=590 bgcolor=#d6d6d6
| 339590 ||  || — || June 30, 2005 || Palomar || NEAT || — || align=right | 4.8 km || 
|-id=591 bgcolor=#fefefe
| 339591 ||  || — || June 28, 2005 || Palomar || NEAT || V || align=right data-sort-value="0.75" | 750 m || 
|-id=592 bgcolor=#fefefe
| 339592 ||  || — || June 30, 2005 || Kitt Peak || Spacewatch || FLO || align=right data-sort-value="0.70" | 700 m || 
|-id=593 bgcolor=#fefefe
| 339593 ||  || — || June 17, 2005 || Mount Lemmon || Mount Lemmon Survey || — || align=right data-sort-value="0.94" | 940 m || 
|-id=594 bgcolor=#fefefe
| 339594 ||  || — || July 2, 2005 || Kitt Peak || Spacewatch || — || align=right data-sort-value="0.71" | 710 m || 
|-id=595 bgcolor=#fefefe
| 339595 ||  || — || July 1, 2005 || Kitt Peak || Spacewatch || — || align=right data-sort-value="0.79" | 790 m || 
|-id=596 bgcolor=#fefefe
| 339596 ||  || — || July 5, 2005 || Palomar || NEAT || — || align=right data-sort-value="0.72" | 720 m || 
|-id=597 bgcolor=#fefefe
| 339597 ||  || — || July 6, 2005 || Kitt Peak || Spacewatch || FLO || align=right data-sort-value="0.89" | 890 m || 
|-id=598 bgcolor=#fefefe
| 339598 ||  || — || July 3, 2005 || Mount Lemmon || Mount Lemmon Survey || — || align=right data-sort-value="0.73" | 730 m || 
|-id=599 bgcolor=#fefefe
| 339599 ||  || — || July 10, 2005 || Kitt Peak || Spacewatch || — || align=right data-sort-value="0.81" | 810 m || 
|-id=600 bgcolor=#fefefe
| 339600 ||  || — || July 10, 2005 || Kitt Peak || Spacewatch || — || align=right data-sort-value="0.63" | 630 m || 
|}

339601–339700 

|-bgcolor=#fefefe
| 339601 ||  || — || July 3, 2005 || Mount Lemmon || Mount Lemmon Survey || NYS || align=right data-sort-value="0.68" | 680 m || 
|-id=602 bgcolor=#fefefe
| 339602 ||  || — || July 4, 2005 || Kitt Peak || Spacewatch || NYS || align=right data-sort-value="0.68" | 680 m || 
|-id=603 bgcolor=#fefefe
| 339603 ||  || — || July 9, 2005 || Kitt Peak || Spacewatch || — || align=right data-sort-value="0.71" | 710 m || 
|-id=604 bgcolor=#fefefe
| 339604 ||  || — || July 4, 2005 || Mount Lemmon || Mount Lemmon Survey || — || align=right | 1.1 km || 
|-id=605 bgcolor=#fefefe
| 339605 ||  || — || July 16, 2005 || Kitt Peak || Spacewatch || — || align=right data-sort-value="0.82" | 820 m || 
|-id=606 bgcolor=#fefefe
| 339606 ||  || — || July 10, 2005 || Siding Spring || SSS || FLO || align=right data-sort-value="0.79" | 790 m || 
|-id=607 bgcolor=#fefefe
| 339607 ||  || — || July 28, 2005 || Reedy Creek || J. Broughton || V || align=right data-sort-value="0.66" | 660 m || 
|-id=608 bgcolor=#fefefe
| 339608 ||  || — || July 28, 2005 || Palomar || NEAT || NYS || align=right data-sort-value="0.76" | 760 m || 
|-id=609 bgcolor=#fefefe
| 339609 ||  || — || July 28, 2005 || Palomar || NEAT || — || align=right data-sort-value="0.92" | 920 m || 
|-id=610 bgcolor=#fefefe
| 339610 ||  || — || July 30, 2005 || Campo Imperatore || CINEOS || FLO || align=right data-sort-value="0.57" | 570 m || 
|-id=611 bgcolor=#fefefe
| 339611 ||  || — || July 4, 2005 || Palomar || NEAT || — || align=right data-sort-value="0.79" | 790 m || 
|-id=612 bgcolor=#fefefe
| 339612 ||  || — || July 29, 2005 || Palomar || NEAT || — || align=right | 1.1 km || 
|-id=613 bgcolor=#fefefe
| 339613 ||  || — || July 30, 2005 || Palomar || NEAT || V || align=right data-sort-value="0.65" | 650 m || 
|-id=614 bgcolor=#fefefe
| 339614 ||  || — || July 29, 2005 || Palomar || NEAT || NYS || align=right data-sort-value="0.69" | 690 m || 
|-id=615 bgcolor=#fefefe
| 339615 ||  || — || July 31, 2005 || Palomar || NEAT || — || align=right data-sort-value="0.86" | 860 m || 
|-id=616 bgcolor=#fefefe
| 339616 ||  || — || July 31, 2005 || Palomar || NEAT || FLO || align=right data-sort-value="0.80" | 800 m || 
|-id=617 bgcolor=#fefefe
| 339617 ||  || — || July 28, 2005 || Palomar || NEAT || — || align=right | 1.0 km || 
|-id=618 bgcolor=#fefefe
| 339618 ||  || — || July 30, 2005 || Palomar || NEAT || — || align=right data-sort-value="0.96" | 960 m || 
|-id=619 bgcolor=#fefefe
| 339619 ||  || — || July 30, 2005 || Palomar || NEAT || — || align=right | 1.0 km || 
|-id=620 bgcolor=#fefefe
| 339620 ||  || — || August 7, 2005 || Siding Spring || SSS || — || align=right | 1.1 km || 
|-id=621 bgcolor=#fefefe
| 339621 ||  || — || August 9, 2005 || Ottmarsheim || Ottmarsheim Obs. || PHO || align=right | 1.7 km || 
|-id=622 bgcolor=#fefefe
| 339622 ||  || — || August 4, 2005 || Palomar || NEAT || FLO || align=right data-sort-value="0.77" | 770 m || 
|-id=623 bgcolor=#fefefe
| 339623 ||  || — || August 12, 2005 || Pla D'Arguines || R. Ferrando, M. Ferrando || — || align=right data-sort-value="0.84" | 840 m || 
|-id=624 bgcolor=#fefefe
| 339624 ||  || — || August 6, 2005 || Palomar || NEAT || NYS || align=right data-sort-value="0.72" | 720 m || 
|-id=625 bgcolor=#fefefe
| 339625 ||  || — || August 22, 2005 || Palomar || NEAT || V || align=right data-sort-value="0.70" | 700 m || 
|-id=626 bgcolor=#fefefe
| 339626 ||  || — || July 27, 2005 || Palomar || NEAT || — || align=right | 1.0 km || 
|-id=627 bgcolor=#fefefe
| 339627 ||  || — || August 24, 2005 || Palomar || NEAT || FLO || align=right data-sort-value="0.83" | 830 m || 
|-id=628 bgcolor=#fefefe
| 339628 ||  || — || August 25, 2005 || Palomar || NEAT || NYS || align=right data-sort-value="0.77" | 770 m || 
|-id=629 bgcolor=#fefefe
| 339629 ||  || — || August 25, 2005 || Palomar || NEAT || — || align=right | 1.1 km || 
|-id=630 bgcolor=#fefefe
| 339630 ||  || — || August 25, 2005 || Campo Imperatore || CINEOS || — || align=right data-sort-value="0.91" | 910 m || 
|-id=631 bgcolor=#fefefe
| 339631 ||  || — || August 24, 2005 || Palomar || NEAT || V || align=right data-sort-value="0.94" | 940 m || 
|-id=632 bgcolor=#fefefe
| 339632 ||  || — || August 25, 2005 || Palomar || NEAT || — || align=right data-sort-value="0.92" | 920 m || 
|-id=633 bgcolor=#fefefe
| 339633 ||  || — || August 27, 2005 || Kitt Peak || Spacewatch || NYS || align=right data-sort-value="0.69" | 690 m || 
|-id=634 bgcolor=#FA8072
| 339634 ||  || — || August 27, 2005 || Kitt Peak || Spacewatch || — || align=right data-sort-value="0.77" | 770 m || 
|-id=635 bgcolor=#fefefe
| 339635 ||  || — || August 29, 2005 || Vicques || M. Ory || — || align=right data-sort-value="0.75" | 750 m || 
|-id=636 bgcolor=#fefefe
| 339636 ||  || — || August 24, 2005 || Needville || Needville Obs. || — || align=right data-sort-value="0.86" | 860 m || 
|-id=637 bgcolor=#fefefe
| 339637 ||  || — || August 25, 2005 || Palomar || NEAT || — || align=right data-sort-value="0.74" | 740 m || 
|-id=638 bgcolor=#fefefe
| 339638 ||  || — || August 25, 2005 || Palomar || NEAT || — || align=right | 1.3 km || 
|-id=639 bgcolor=#fefefe
| 339639 ||  || — || August 25, 2005 || Palomar || NEAT || — || align=right | 1.1 km || 
|-id=640 bgcolor=#fefefe
| 339640 ||  || — || August 25, 2005 || Palomar || NEAT || FLO || align=right data-sort-value="0.64" | 640 m || 
|-id=641 bgcolor=#fefefe
| 339641 ||  || — || August 26, 2005 || Anderson Mesa || LONEOS || — || align=right data-sort-value="0.95" | 950 m || 
|-id=642 bgcolor=#fefefe
| 339642 ||  || — || August 26, 2005 || Anderson Mesa || LONEOS || — || align=right | 1.9 km || 
|-id=643 bgcolor=#fefefe
| 339643 ||  || — || August 26, 2005 || Palomar || NEAT || — || align=right | 1.9 km || 
|-id=644 bgcolor=#fefefe
| 339644 ||  || — || August 26, 2005 || Palomar || NEAT || — || align=right data-sort-value="0.86" | 860 m || 
|-id=645 bgcolor=#fefefe
| 339645 ||  || — || August 26, 2005 || Palomar || NEAT || — || align=right | 1.1 km || 
|-id=646 bgcolor=#fefefe
| 339646 ||  || — || August 26, 2005 || Palomar || NEAT || — || align=right | 1.0 km || 
|-id=647 bgcolor=#fefefe
| 339647 ||  || — || August 27, 2005 || Siding Spring || SSS || — || align=right data-sort-value="0.88" | 880 m || 
|-id=648 bgcolor=#fefefe
| 339648 ||  || — || August 28, 2005 || Kitt Peak || Spacewatch || FLO || align=right data-sort-value="0.80" | 800 m || 
|-id=649 bgcolor=#FA8072
| 339649 ||  || — || August 28, 2005 || Kitt Peak || Spacewatch || — || align=right data-sort-value="0.77" | 770 m || 
|-id=650 bgcolor=#fefefe
| 339650 ||  || — || August 29, 2005 || Vail-Jarnac || Jarnac Obs. || — || align=right data-sort-value="0.82" | 820 m || 
|-id=651 bgcolor=#fefefe
| 339651 ||  || — || August 26, 2005 || Anderson Mesa || LONEOS || V || align=right data-sort-value="0.81" | 810 m || 
|-id=652 bgcolor=#fefefe
| 339652 ||  || — || August 28, 2005 || Kitt Peak || Spacewatch || NYS || align=right data-sort-value="0.69" | 690 m || 
|-id=653 bgcolor=#fefefe
| 339653 ||  || — || August 28, 2005 || Siding Spring || SSS || — || align=right | 1.0 km || 
|-id=654 bgcolor=#fefefe
| 339654 ||  || — || August 29, 2005 || Socorro || LINEAR || NYS || align=right data-sort-value="0.69" | 690 m || 
|-id=655 bgcolor=#fefefe
| 339655 ||  || — || August 29, 2005 || Anderson Mesa || LONEOS || — || align=right data-sort-value="0.82" | 820 m || 
|-id=656 bgcolor=#fefefe
| 339656 ||  || — || August 29, 2005 || Kitt Peak || Spacewatch || — || align=right data-sort-value="0.94" | 940 m || 
|-id=657 bgcolor=#fefefe
| 339657 ||  || — || August 29, 2005 || Socorro || LINEAR || PHO || align=right | 1.3 km || 
|-id=658 bgcolor=#fefefe
| 339658 ||  || — || August 29, 2005 || Anderson Mesa || LONEOS || — || align=right | 1.1 km || 
|-id=659 bgcolor=#fefefe
| 339659 ||  || — || August 29, 2005 || Socorro || LINEAR || — || align=right data-sort-value="0.76" | 760 m || 
|-id=660 bgcolor=#fefefe
| 339660 ||  || — || August 29, 2005 || Socorro || LINEAR || FLO || align=right data-sort-value="0.73" | 730 m || 
|-id=661 bgcolor=#fefefe
| 339661 ||  || — || August 27, 2005 || Palomar || NEAT || — || align=right data-sort-value="0.83" | 830 m || 
|-id=662 bgcolor=#fefefe
| 339662 ||  || — || August 29, 2005 || Anderson Mesa || LONEOS || — || align=right data-sort-value="0.96" | 960 m || 
|-id=663 bgcolor=#fefefe
| 339663 ||  || — || August 30, 2005 || Socorro || LINEAR || FLO || align=right data-sort-value="0.98" | 980 m || 
|-id=664 bgcolor=#d6d6d6
| 339664 ||  || — || August 31, 2005 || Anderson Mesa || LONEOS || — || align=right | 4.2 km || 
|-id=665 bgcolor=#d6d6d6
| 339665 ||  || — || August 26, 2005 || Palomar || NEAT || SYL7:4 || align=right | 5.3 km || 
|-id=666 bgcolor=#fefefe
| 339666 ||  || — || August 27, 2005 || Palomar || NEAT || V || align=right data-sort-value="0.97" | 970 m || 
|-id=667 bgcolor=#fefefe
| 339667 ||  || — || July 29, 2005 || Palomar || NEAT || — || align=right data-sort-value="0.99" | 990 m || 
|-id=668 bgcolor=#fefefe
| 339668 ||  || — || August 27, 2005 || Palomar || NEAT || NYS || align=right data-sort-value="0.74" | 740 m || 
|-id=669 bgcolor=#FA8072
| 339669 ||  || — || August 27, 2005 || Palomar || NEAT || — || align=right data-sort-value="0.86" | 860 m || 
|-id=670 bgcolor=#fefefe
| 339670 ||  || — || August 28, 2005 || Kitt Peak || Spacewatch || — || align=right data-sort-value="0.90" | 900 m || 
|-id=671 bgcolor=#fefefe
| 339671 ||  || — || August 28, 2005 || Kitt Peak || Spacewatch || — || align=right data-sort-value="0.71" | 710 m || 
|-id=672 bgcolor=#fefefe
| 339672 ||  || — || August 28, 2005 || Kitt Peak || Spacewatch || FLO || align=right data-sort-value="0.74" | 740 m || 
|-id=673 bgcolor=#fefefe
| 339673 ||  || — || August 28, 2005 || Kitt Peak || Spacewatch || NYS || align=right data-sort-value="0.58" | 580 m || 
|-id=674 bgcolor=#fefefe
| 339674 ||  || — || August 29, 2005 || Kitt Peak || Spacewatch || — || align=right data-sort-value="0.74" | 740 m || 
|-id=675 bgcolor=#fefefe
| 339675 ||  || — || August 31, 2005 || Anderson Mesa || LONEOS || — || align=right | 1.9 km || 
|-id=676 bgcolor=#fefefe
| 339676 ||  || — || August 26, 2005 || Palomar || NEAT || — || align=right data-sort-value="0.71" | 710 m || 
|-id=677 bgcolor=#fefefe
| 339677 ||  || — || August 28, 2005 || Anderson Mesa || LONEOS || — || align=right data-sort-value="0.89" | 890 m || 
|-id=678 bgcolor=#fefefe
| 339678 ||  || — || August 28, 2005 || Siding Spring || SSS || — || align=right | 1.0 km || 
|-id=679 bgcolor=#fefefe
| 339679 ||  || — || August 30, 2005 || Kitt Peak || Spacewatch || V || align=right data-sort-value="0.72" | 720 m || 
|-id=680 bgcolor=#fefefe
| 339680 ||  || — || August 28, 2005 || Siding Spring || SSS || NYS || align=right data-sort-value="0.74" | 740 m || 
|-id=681 bgcolor=#fefefe
| 339681 ||  || — || August 31, 2005 || Palomar || NEAT || — || align=right | 1.5 km || 
|-id=682 bgcolor=#fefefe
| 339682 ||  || — || August 27, 2005 || Campo Imperatore || CINEOS || — || align=right data-sort-value="0.96" | 960 m || 
|-id=683 bgcolor=#fefefe
| 339683 ||  || — || August 29, 2005 || Palomar || NEAT || FLO || align=right data-sort-value="0.87" | 870 m || 
|-id=684 bgcolor=#fefefe
| 339684 ||  || — || August 29, 2005 || Palomar || NEAT || — || align=right data-sort-value="0.94" | 940 m || 
|-id=685 bgcolor=#fefefe
| 339685 ||  || — || August 29, 2005 || Palomar || NEAT || NYS || align=right data-sort-value="0.70" | 700 m || 
|-id=686 bgcolor=#fefefe
| 339686 ||  || — || August 31, 2005 || Kitt Peak || Spacewatch || NYS || align=right data-sort-value="0.74" | 740 m || 
|-id=687 bgcolor=#fefefe
| 339687 ||  || — || August 27, 2005 || Kitt Peak || Spacewatch || FLO || align=right data-sort-value="0.79" | 790 m || 
|-id=688 bgcolor=#fefefe
| 339688 ||  || — || August 30, 2005 || Kitt Peak || Spacewatch || — || align=right data-sort-value="0.80" | 800 m || 
|-id=689 bgcolor=#fefefe
| 339689 ||  || — || August 25, 2005 || Palomar || NEAT || — || align=right data-sort-value="0.68" | 680 m || 
|-id=690 bgcolor=#fefefe
| 339690 ||  || — || August 26, 2005 || Palomar || NEAT || — || align=right data-sort-value="0.85" | 850 m || 
|-id=691 bgcolor=#fefefe
| 339691 ||  || — || August 30, 2005 || Palomar || NEAT || V || align=right data-sort-value="0.70" | 700 m || 
|-id=692 bgcolor=#fefefe
| 339692 ||  || — || August 31, 2005 || Kitt Peak || Spacewatch || NYS || align=right data-sort-value="0.70" | 700 m || 
|-id=693 bgcolor=#fefefe
| 339693 ||  || — || August 31, 2005 || Kitt Peak || Spacewatch || — || align=right data-sort-value="0.78" | 780 m || 
|-id=694 bgcolor=#fefefe
| 339694 ||  || — || August 25, 2005 || Palomar || NEAT || — || align=right data-sort-value="0.77" | 770 m || 
|-id=695 bgcolor=#fefefe
| 339695 ||  || — || August 28, 2005 || Kitt Peak || Spacewatch || — || align=right data-sort-value="0.75" | 750 m || 
|-id=696 bgcolor=#fefefe
| 339696 ||  || — || August 31, 2005 || Palomar || NEAT || FLO || align=right data-sort-value="0.86" | 860 m || 
|-id=697 bgcolor=#d6d6d6
| 339697 || 2005 RH || — || September 1, 2005 || Cordell-Lorenz || D. T. Durig || 7:4 || align=right | 4.5 km || 
|-id=698 bgcolor=#fefefe
| 339698 ||  || — || September 2, 2005 || Palomar || NEAT || PHO || align=right | 1.4 km || 
|-id=699 bgcolor=#fefefe
| 339699 ||  || — || September 1, 2005 || Palomar || NEAT || V || align=right data-sort-value="0.89" | 890 m || 
|-id=700 bgcolor=#FA8072
| 339700 ||  || — || September 6, 2005 || Anderson Mesa || LONEOS || — || align=right data-sort-value="0.84" | 840 m || 
|}

339701–339800 

|-bgcolor=#fefefe
| 339701 ||  || — || September 7, 2005 || Altschwendt || Altschwendt Obs. || — || align=right data-sort-value="0.98" | 980 m || 
|-id=702 bgcolor=#fefefe
| 339702 ||  || — || September 3, 2005 || Palomar || NEAT || PHO || align=right | 1.6 km || 
|-id=703 bgcolor=#fefefe
| 339703 ||  || — || September 8, 2005 || Siding Spring || SSS || — || align=right | 1.2 km || 
|-id=704 bgcolor=#fefefe
| 339704 ||  || — || September 10, 2005 || Anderson Mesa || LONEOS || FLO || align=right data-sort-value="0.96" | 960 m || 
|-id=705 bgcolor=#FA8072
| 339705 ||  || — || September 6, 2005 || Siding Spring || SSS || — || align=right | 1.0 km || 
|-id=706 bgcolor=#fefefe
| 339706 ||  || — || September 10, 2005 || Anderson Mesa || LONEOS || V || align=right data-sort-value="0.93" | 930 m || 
|-id=707 bgcolor=#fefefe
| 339707 ||  || — || September 10, 2005 || Anderson Mesa || LONEOS || PHO || align=right | 1.5 km || 
|-id=708 bgcolor=#fefefe
| 339708 ||  || — || September 11, 2005 || Socorro || LINEAR || — || align=right data-sort-value="0.75" | 750 m || 
|-id=709 bgcolor=#fefefe
| 339709 ||  || — || September 8, 2005 || Socorro || LINEAR || NYS || align=right data-sort-value="0.78" | 780 m || 
|-id=710 bgcolor=#fefefe
| 339710 ||  || — || September 13, 2005 || Kitt Peak || Spacewatch || — || align=right | 1.0 km || 
|-id=711 bgcolor=#fefefe
| 339711 ||  || — || September 14, 2005 || Catalina || CSS || FLO || align=right data-sort-value="0.73" | 730 m || 
|-id=712 bgcolor=#fefefe
| 339712 || 2005 SE || — || September 16, 2005 || Mayhill || R. Hutsebaut || V || align=right data-sort-value="0.82" | 820 m || 
|-id=713 bgcolor=#FA8072
| 339713 ||  || — || September 22, 2005 || Palomar || NEAT || — || align=right | 1.00 km || 
|-id=714 bgcolor=#FFC2E0
| 339714 ||  || — || September 24, 2005 || Catalina || CSS || APO || align=right data-sort-value="0.30" | 300 m || 
|-id=715 bgcolor=#FFC2E0
| 339715 ||  || — || September 24, 2005 || Catalina || CSS || APO || align=right data-sort-value="0.57" | 570 m || 
|-id=716 bgcolor=#fefefe
| 339716 ||  || — || September 23, 2005 || Catalina || CSS || — || align=right data-sort-value="0.80" | 800 m || 
|-id=717 bgcolor=#fefefe
| 339717 ||  || — || September 24, 2005 || Kitt Peak || Spacewatch || FLO || align=right data-sort-value="0.67" | 670 m || 
|-id=718 bgcolor=#fefefe
| 339718 ||  || — || September 25, 2005 || Kitt Peak || Spacewatch || FLO || align=right data-sort-value="0.77" | 770 m || 
|-id=719 bgcolor=#fefefe
| 339719 ||  || — || September 25, 2005 || Goodricke-Pigott || R. A. Tucker || — || align=right | 3.4 km || 
|-id=720 bgcolor=#fefefe
| 339720 ||  || — || September 23, 2005 || Catalina || CSS || — || align=right data-sort-value="0.93" | 930 m || 
|-id=721 bgcolor=#fefefe
| 339721 ||  || — || September 24, 2005 || Kitt Peak || Spacewatch || — || align=right data-sort-value="0.86" | 860 m || 
|-id=722 bgcolor=#fefefe
| 339722 ||  || — || September 24, 2005 || Kitt Peak || Spacewatch || — || align=right | 1.2 km || 
|-id=723 bgcolor=#fefefe
| 339723 ||  || — || September 23, 2005 || Kitt Peak || Spacewatch || — || align=right data-sort-value="0.82" | 820 m || 
|-id=724 bgcolor=#fefefe
| 339724 ||  || — || September 23, 2005 || Kitt Peak || Spacewatch || — || align=right data-sort-value="0.96" | 960 m || 
|-id=725 bgcolor=#fefefe
| 339725 ||  || — || September 23, 2005 || Kitt Peak || Spacewatch || V || align=right data-sort-value="0.82" | 820 m || 
|-id=726 bgcolor=#fefefe
| 339726 ||  || — || September 23, 2005 || Kitt Peak || Spacewatch || — || align=right data-sort-value="0.75" | 750 m || 
|-id=727 bgcolor=#d6d6d6
| 339727 ||  || — || September 24, 2005 || Kitt Peak || Spacewatch || SYL7:4 || align=right | 5.1 km || 
|-id=728 bgcolor=#fefefe
| 339728 ||  || — || September 24, 2005 || Kitt Peak || Spacewatch || — || align=right data-sort-value="0.71" | 710 m || 
|-id=729 bgcolor=#fefefe
| 339729 ||  || — || September 24, 2005 || Kitt Peak || Spacewatch || FLO || align=right data-sort-value="0.75" | 750 m || 
|-id=730 bgcolor=#fefefe
| 339730 ||  || — || September 24, 2005 || Kitt Peak || Spacewatch || FLO || align=right data-sort-value="0.61" | 610 m || 
|-id=731 bgcolor=#fefefe
| 339731 ||  || — || September 24, 2005 || Kitt Peak || Spacewatch || — || align=right data-sort-value="0.86" | 860 m || 
|-id=732 bgcolor=#FA8072
| 339732 ||  || — || September 24, 2005 || Kitt Peak || Spacewatch || — || align=right data-sort-value="0.94" | 940 m || 
|-id=733 bgcolor=#fefefe
| 339733 ||  || — || September 24, 2005 || Kitt Peak || Spacewatch || — || align=right data-sort-value="0.77" | 770 m || 
|-id=734 bgcolor=#fefefe
| 339734 ||  || — || September 24, 2005 || Kitt Peak || Spacewatch || NYS || align=right data-sort-value="0.68" | 680 m || 
|-id=735 bgcolor=#fefefe
| 339735 ||  || — || September 24, 2005 || Kitt Peak || Spacewatch || V || align=right data-sort-value="0.76" | 760 m || 
|-id=736 bgcolor=#fefefe
| 339736 ||  || — || September 24, 2005 || Kitt Peak || Spacewatch || V || align=right data-sort-value="0.74" | 740 m || 
|-id=737 bgcolor=#fefefe
| 339737 ||  || — || September 24, 2005 || Kitt Peak || Spacewatch || — || align=right | 1.00 km || 
|-id=738 bgcolor=#fefefe
| 339738 ||  || — || September 24, 2005 || Kitt Peak || Spacewatch || NYS || align=right data-sort-value="0.72" | 720 m || 
|-id=739 bgcolor=#FA8072
| 339739 ||  || — || September 24, 2005 || Kitt Peak || Spacewatch || — || align=right data-sort-value="0.65" | 650 m || 
|-id=740 bgcolor=#fefefe
| 339740 ||  || — || September 24, 2005 || Kitt Peak || Spacewatch || — || align=right data-sort-value="0.91" | 910 m || 
|-id=741 bgcolor=#fefefe
| 339741 ||  || — || September 24, 2005 || Kitt Peak || Spacewatch || V || align=right | 1.00 km || 
|-id=742 bgcolor=#fefefe
| 339742 ||  || — || September 25, 2005 || Kitt Peak || Spacewatch || — || align=right data-sort-value="0.89" | 890 m || 
|-id=743 bgcolor=#fefefe
| 339743 ||  || — || September 25, 2005 || Kitt Peak || Spacewatch || — || align=right data-sort-value="0.92" | 920 m || 
|-id=744 bgcolor=#fefefe
| 339744 ||  || — || September 25, 2005 || Kitt Peak || Spacewatch || NYS || align=right data-sort-value="0.91" | 910 m || 
|-id=745 bgcolor=#FA8072
| 339745 ||  || — || September 25, 2005 || Kitt Peak || Spacewatch || — || align=right data-sort-value="0.82" | 820 m || 
|-id=746 bgcolor=#fefefe
| 339746 ||  || — || September 26, 2005 || Kitt Peak || Spacewatch || NYS || align=right data-sort-value="0.69" | 690 m || 
|-id=747 bgcolor=#fefefe
| 339747 ||  || — || September 26, 2005 || Kitt Peak || Spacewatch || V || align=right data-sort-value="0.62" | 620 m || 
|-id=748 bgcolor=#fefefe
| 339748 ||  || — || September 26, 2005 || Kitt Peak || Spacewatch || — || align=right | 1.2 km || 
|-id=749 bgcolor=#fefefe
| 339749 ||  || — || July 2, 2005 || Kitt Peak || Spacewatch || NYS || align=right data-sort-value="0.71" | 710 m || 
|-id=750 bgcolor=#fefefe
| 339750 ||  || — || September 26, 2005 || Kitt Peak || Spacewatch || — || align=right data-sort-value="0.92" | 920 m || 
|-id=751 bgcolor=#fefefe
| 339751 ||  || — || September 26, 2005 || Kitt Peak || Spacewatch || FLO || align=right data-sort-value="0.64" | 640 m || 
|-id=752 bgcolor=#fefefe
| 339752 ||  || — || September 26, 2005 || Palomar || NEAT || FLO || align=right data-sort-value="0.66" | 660 m || 
|-id=753 bgcolor=#fefefe
| 339753 ||  || — || September 27, 2005 || Kitt Peak || Spacewatch || — || align=right data-sort-value="0.70" | 700 m || 
|-id=754 bgcolor=#fefefe
| 339754 ||  || — || September 27, 2005 || Kitt Peak || Spacewatch || FLO || align=right data-sort-value="0.70" | 700 m || 
|-id=755 bgcolor=#fefefe
| 339755 ||  || — || September 23, 2005 || Kitt Peak || Spacewatch || V || align=right data-sort-value="0.67" | 670 m || 
|-id=756 bgcolor=#fefefe
| 339756 ||  || — || September 23, 2005 || Kitt Peak || Spacewatch || NYS || align=right data-sort-value="0.71" | 710 m || 
|-id=757 bgcolor=#fefefe
| 339757 ||  || — || September 24, 2005 || Kitt Peak || Spacewatch || FLO || align=right data-sort-value="0.66" | 660 m || 
|-id=758 bgcolor=#fefefe
| 339758 ||  || — || September 24, 2005 || Kitt Peak || Spacewatch || FLO || align=right data-sort-value="0.68" | 680 m || 
|-id=759 bgcolor=#fefefe
| 339759 ||  || — || September 24, 2005 || Kitt Peak || Spacewatch || — || align=right data-sort-value="0.76" | 760 m || 
|-id=760 bgcolor=#fefefe
| 339760 ||  || — || September 24, 2005 || Kitt Peak || Spacewatch || — || align=right data-sort-value="0.94" | 940 m || 
|-id=761 bgcolor=#fefefe
| 339761 ||  || — || September 24, 2005 || Kitt Peak || Spacewatch || — || align=right data-sort-value="0.59" | 590 m || 
|-id=762 bgcolor=#fefefe
| 339762 ||  || — || September 24, 2005 || Kitt Peak || Spacewatch || FLO || align=right data-sort-value="0.72" | 720 m || 
|-id=763 bgcolor=#d6d6d6
| 339763 ||  || — || September 25, 2005 || Kitt Peak || Spacewatch || SYL7:4 || align=right | 4.4 km || 
|-id=764 bgcolor=#fefefe
| 339764 ||  || — || September 25, 2005 || Palomar || NEAT || — || align=right | 1.0 km || 
|-id=765 bgcolor=#fefefe
| 339765 ||  || — || September 25, 2005 || Palomar || NEAT || — || align=right | 1.0 km || 
|-id=766 bgcolor=#fefefe
| 339766 ||  || — || September 25, 2005 || Kitt Peak || Spacewatch || FLO || align=right data-sort-value="0.81" | 810 m || 
|-id=767 bgcolor=#fefefe
| 339767 ||  || — || September 25, 2005 || Kitt Peak || Spacewatch || — || align=right data-sort-value="0.99" | 990 m || 
|-id=768 bgcolor=#fefefe
| 339768 ||  || — || September 25, 2005 || Palomar || NEAT || — || align=right data-sort-value="0.96" | 960 m || 
|-id=769 bgcolor=#fefefe
| 339769 ||  || — || September 26, 2005 || Kitt Peak || Spacewatch || FLO || align=right data-sort-value="0.69" | 690 m || 
|-id=770 bgcolor=#fefefe
| 339770 ||  || — || September 26, 2005 || Kitt Peak || Spacewatch || — || align=right data-sort-value="0.92" | 920 m || 
|-id=771 bgcolor=#fefefe
| 339771 ||  || — || September 26, 2005 || Palomar || NEAT || V || align=right data-sort-value="0.83" | 830 m || 
|-id=772 bgcolor=#fefefe
| 339772 ||  || — || September 27, 2005 || Kitt Peak || Spacewatch || — || align=right | 1.3 km || 
|-id=773 bgcolor=#fefefe
| 339773 ||  || — || September 27, 2005 || Kitt Peak || Spacewatch || — || align=right data-sort-value="0.82" | 820 m || 
|-id=774 bgcolor=#fefefe
| 339774 ||  || — || September 27, 2005 || Kitt Peak || Spacewatch || — || align=right data-sort-value="0.85" | 850 m || 
|-id=775 bgcolor=#fefefe
| 339775 ||  || — || September 28, 2005 || Palomar || NEAT || V || align=right data-sort-value="0.84" | 840 m || 
|-id=776 bgcolor=#fefefe
| 339776 ||  || — || September 29, 2005 || Kitt Peak || Spacewatch || — || align=right data-sort-value="0.81" | 810 m || 
|-id=777 bgcolor=#fefefe
| 339777 ||  || — || September 29, 2005 || Kitt Peak || Spacewatch || NYS || align=right data-sort-value="0.84" | 840 m || 
|-id=778 bgcolor=#fefefe
| 339778 ||  || — || September 29, 2005 || Anderson Mesa || LONEOS || — || align=right | 1.1 km || 
|-id=779 bgcolor=#fefefe
| 339779 ||  || — || September 29, 2005 || Mount Lemmon || Mount Lemmon Survey || — || align=right data-sort-value="0.94" | 940 m || 
|-id=780 bgcolor=#fefefe
| 339780 ||  || — || September 29, 2005 || Kitt Peak || Spacewatch || — || align=right | 1.2 km || 
|-id=781 bgcolor=#fefefe
| 339781 ||  || — || September 30, 2005 || Kitt Peak || Spacewatch || PHO || align=right | 1.2 km || 
|-id=782 bgcolor=#fefefe
| 339782 ||  || — || September 24, 2005 || Kitt Peak || Spacewatch || FLO || align=right | 2.1 km || 
|-id=783 bgcolor=#fefefe
| 339783 ||  || — || September 24, 2005 || Kitt Peak || Spacewatch || V || align=right data-sort-value="0.80" | 800 m || 
|-id=784 bgcolor=#fefefe
| 339784 ||  || — || September 25, 2005 || Kitt Peak || Spacewatch || V || align=right data-sort-value="0.80" | 800 m || 
|-id=785 bgcolor=#fefefe
| 339785 ||  || — || September 25, 2005 || Kitt Peak || Spacewatch || PHO || align=right | 1.0 km || 
|-id=786 bgcolor=#fefefe
| 339786 ||  || — || September 25, 2005 || Kitt Peak || Spacewatch || FLO || align=right data-sort-value="0.87" | 870 m || 
|-id=787 bgcolor=#fefefe
| 339787 ||  || — || September 25, 2005 || Kitt Peak || Spacewatch || — || align=right | 1.1 km || 
|-id=788 bgcolor=#fefefe
| 339788 ||  || — || September 25, 2005 || Kitt Peak || Spacewatch || FLO || align=right data-sort-value="0.63" | 630 m || 
|-id=789 bgcolor=#fefefe
| 339789 ||  || — || September 26, 2005 || Kitt Peak || Spacewatch || — || align=right data-sort-value="0.72" | 720 m || 
|-id=790 bgcolor=#fefefe
| 339790 ||  || — || September 27, 2005 || Kitt Peak || Spacewatch || — || align=right data-sort-value="0.82" | 820 m || 
|-id=791 bgcolor=#fefefe
| 339791 ||  || — || September 29, 2005 || Kitt Peak || Spacewatch || — || align=right | 1.2 km || 
|-id=792 bgcolor=#fefefe
| 339792 ||  || — || September 29, 2005 || Palomar || NEAT || — || align=right | 1.1 km || 
|-id=793 bgcolor=#fefefe
| 339793 ||  || — || September 29, 2005 || Anderson Mesa || LONEOS || — || align=right data-sort-value="0.78" | 780 m || 
|-id=794 bgcolor=#fefefe
| 339794 ||  || — || September 29, 2005 || Kitt Peak || Spacewatch || — || align=right data-sort-value="0.83" | 830 m || 
|-id=795 bgcolor=#fefefe
| 339795 ||  || — || September 29, 2005 || Kitt Peak || Spacewatch || — || align=right data-sort-value="0.86" | 860 m || 
|-id=796 bgcolor=#fefefe
| 339796 ||  || — || September 29, 2005 || Mount Lemmon || Mount Lemmon Survey || — || align=right data-sort-value="0.84" | 840 m || 
|-id=797 bgcolor=#fefefe
| 339797 ||  || — || September 29, 2005 || Mount Lemmon || Mount Lemmon Survey || — || align=right data-sort-value="0.82" | 820 m || 
|-id=798 bgcolor=#fefefe
| 339798 ||  || — || September 29, 2005 || Kitt Peak || Spacewatch || FLO || align=right data-sort-value="0.84" | 840 m || 
|-id=799 bgcolor=#fefefe
| 339799 ||  || — || September 29, 2005 || Mount Lemmon || Mount Lemmon Survey || V || align=right data-sort-value="0.97" | 970 m || 
|-id=800 bgcolor=#fefefe
| 339800 ||  || — || September 29, 2005 || Kitt Peak || Spacewatch || V || align=right data-sort-value="0.62" | 620 m || 
|}

339801–339900 

|-bgcolor=#fefefe
| 339801 ||  || — || September 29, 2005 || Kitt Peak || Spacewatch || — || align=right | 1.9 km || 
|-id=802 bgcolor=#fefefe
| 339802 ||  || — || September 30, 2005 || Kitt Peak || Spacewatch || V || align=right data-sort-value="0.58" | 580 m || 
|-id=803 bgcolor=#fefefe
| 339803 ||  || — || August 25, 2005 || Palomar || NEAT || FLO || align=right data-sort-value="0.77" | 770 m || 
|-id=804 bgcolor=#fefefe
| 339804 ||  || — || September 9, 2005 || Socorro || LINEAR || V || align=right data-sort-value="0.88" | 880 m || 
|-id=805 bgcolor=#fefefe
| 339805 ||  || — || September 30, 2005 || Palomar || NEAT || V || align=right data-sort-value="0.70" | 700 m || 
|-id=806 bgcolor=#fefefe
| 339806 ||  || — || September 30, 2005 || Palomar || NEAT || — || align=right data-sort-value="0.96" | 960 m || 
|-id=807 bgcolor=#fefefe
| 339807 ||  || — || September 30, 2005 || Anderson Mesa || LONEOS || — || align=right | 1.1 km || 
|-id=808 bgcolor=#fefefe
| 339808 ||  || — || September 30, 2005 || Kitt Peak || Spacewatch || ERI || align=right | 1.9 km || 
|-id=809 bgcolor=#fefefe
| 339809 ||  || — || September 30, 2005 || Socorro || LINEAR || V || align=right data-sort-value="0.93" | 930 m || 
|-id=810 bgcolor=#fefefe
| 339810 ||  || — || September 30, 2005 || Catalina || CSS || FLO || align=right data-sort-value="0.88" | 880 m || 
|-id=811 bgcolor=#fefefe
| 339811 ||  || — || September 30, 2005 || Catalina || CSS || — || align=right | 1.2 km || 
|-id=812 bgcolor=#fefefe
| 339812 ||  || — || September 30, 2005 || Anderson Mesa || LONEOS || V || align=right data-sort-value="0.76" | 760 m || 
|-id=813 bgcolor=#fefefe
| 339813 ||  || — || September 30, 2005 || Palomar || NEAT || ERI || align=right | 4.2 km || 
|-id=814 bgcolor=#fefefe
| 339814 ||  || — || September 29, 2005 || Mount Lemmon || Mount Lemmon Survey || MAS || align=right data-sort-value="0.75" | 750 m || 
|-id=815 bgcolor=#fefefe
| 339815 ||  || — || September 23, 2005 || Kitt Peak || Spacewatch || FLO || align=right data-sort-value="0.61" | 610 m || 
|-id=816 bgcolor=#fefefe
| 339816 ||  || — || September 30, 2005 || Kitt Peak || Spacewatch || FLO || align=right data-sort-value="0.65" | 650 m || 
|-id=817 bgcolor=#fefefe
| 339817 ||  || — || September 30, 2005 || Mount Lemmon || Mount Lemmon Survey || NYS || align=right data-sort-value="0.66" | 660 m || 
|-id=818 bgcolor=#fefefe
| 339818 ||  || — || September 30, 2005 || Mount Lemmon || Mount Lemmon Survey || MAS || align=right data-sort-value="0.83" | 830 m || 
|-id=819 bgcolor=#fefefe
| 339819 ||  || — || September 30, 2005 || Mount Lemmon || Mount Lemmon Survey || NYS || align=right data-sort-value="0.73" | 730 m || 
|-id=820 bgcolor=#fefefe
| 339820 ||  || — || September 30, 2005 || Mount Lemmon || Mount Lemmon Survey || MAS || align=right data-sort-value="0.68" | 680 m || 
|-id=821 bgcolor=#fefefe
| 339821 ||  || — || September 29, 2005 || Kitt Peak || Spacewatch || — || align=right data-sort-value="0.84" | 840 m || 
|-id=822 bgcolor=#fefefe
| 339822 ||  || — || September 29, 2005 || Kitt Peak || Spacewatch || NYS || align=right data-sort-value="0.62" | 620 m || 
|-id=823 bgcolor=#fefefe
| 339823 ||  || — || September 30, 2005 || Kitt Peak || Spacewatch || — || align=right data-sort-value="0.73" | 730 m || 
|-id=824 bgcolor=#fefefe
| 339824 ||  || — || September 30, 2005 || Mount Lemmon || Mount Lemmon Survey || MAS || align=right data-sort-value="0.86" | 860 m || 
|-id=825 bgcolor=#fefefe
| 339825 ||  || — || September 26, 2005 || Kitt Peak || Spacewatch || MAS || align=right data-sort-value="0.84" | 840 m || 
|-id=826 bgcolor=#fefefe
| 339826 ||  || — || September 23, 2005 || Kitt Peak || Spacewatch || — || align=right data-sort-value="0.75" | 750 m || 
|-id=827 bgcolor=#fefefe
| 339827 ||  || — || June 18, 2005 || Mount Lemmon || Mount Lemmon Survey || FLO || align=right data-sort-value="0.59" | 590 m || 
|-id=828 bgcolor=#fefefe
| 339828 ||  || — || September 22, 2005 || Palomar || NEAT || — || align=right data-sort-value="0.76" | 760 m || 
|-id=829 bgcolor=#fefefe
| 339829 ||  || — || September 22, 2005 || Palomar || NEAT || FLO || align=right data-sort-value="0.77" | 770 m || 
|-id=830 bgcolor=#fefefe
| 339830 ||  || — || September 25, 2005 || Goodricke-Pigott || R. A. Tucker || FLO || align=right data-sort-value="0.90" | 900 m || 
|-id=831 bgcolor=#fefefe
| 339831 ||  || — || September 29, 2005 || Anderson Mesa || LONEOS || — || align=right data-sort-value="0.94" | 940 m || 
|-id=832 bgcolor=#fefefe
| 339832 ||  || — || September 26, 2005 || Kitt Peak || Spacewatch || — || align=right | 1.0 km || 
|-id=833 bgcolor=#fefefe
| 339833 ||  || — || September 25, 2005 || Kitt Peak || Spacewatch || — || align=right data-sort-value="0.94" | 940 m || 
|-id=834 bgcolor=#d6d6d6
| 339834 ||  || — || September 21, 2005 || Apache Point || A. C. Becker || SYL7:4 || align=right | 4.2 km || 
|-id=835 bgcolor=#fefefe
| 339835 ||  || — || September 23, 2005 || Kitt Peak || Spacewatch || — || align=right data-sort-value="0.91" | 910 m || 
|-id=836 bgcolor=#fefefe
| 339836 ||  || — || September 23, 2005 || Kitt Peak || Spacewatch || — || align=right | 1.6 km || 
|-id=837 bgcolor=#fefefe
| 339837 ||  || — || September 27, 2005 || Kitt Peak || Spacewatch || — || align=right | 1.9 km || 
|-id=838 bgcolor=#fefefe
| 339838 ||  || — || September 30, 2005 || Kitt Peak || Spacewatch || NYS || align=right data-sort-value="0.77" | 770 m || 
|-id=839 bgcolor=#fefefe
| 339839 ||  || — || October 1, 2005 || Kitt Peak || Spacewatch || — || align=right data-sort-value="0.90" | 900 m || 
|-id=840 bgcolor=#fefefe
| 339840 ||  || — || October 1, 2005 || Catalina || CSS || — || align=right | 1.1 km || 
|-id=841 bgcolor=#fefefe
| 339841 ||  || — || October 1, 2005 || Catalina || CSS || — || align=right data-sort-value="0.90" | 900 m || 
|-id=842 bgcolor=#fefefe
| 339842 ||  || — || September 23, 2005 || Kitt Peak || Spacewatch || — || align=right | 1.0 km || 
|-id=843 bgcolor=#fefefe
| 339843 ||  || — || October 1, 2005 || Anderson Mesa || LONEOS || — || align=right data-sort-value="0.99" | 990 m || 
|-id=844 bgcolor=#fefefe
| 339844 ||  || — || September 13, 2005 || Socorro || LINEAR || — || align=right | 1.3 km || 
|-id=845 bgcolor=#fefefe
| 339845 ||  || — || September 23, 2005 || Catalina || CSS || NYS || align=right data-sort-value="0.66" | 660 m || 
|-id=846 bgcolor=#fefefe
| 339846 ||  || — || October 1, 2005 || Socorro || LINEAR || NYS || align=right data-sort-value="0.85" | 850 m || 
|-id=847 bgcolor=#FA8072
| 339847 ||  || — || October 1, 2005 || Socorro || LINEAR || — || align=right | 1.1 km || 
|-id=848 bgcolor=#fefefe
| 339848 ||  || — || October 1, 2005 || Mount Lemmon || Mount Lemmon Survey || — || align=right data-sort-value="0.81" | 810 m || 
|-id=849 bgcolor=#fefefe
| 339849 ||  || — || October 1, 2005 || Mount Lemmon || Mount Lemmon Survey || — || align=right | 1.1 km || 
|-id=850 bgcolor=#fefefe
| 339850 ||  || — || October 1, 2005 || Kitt Peak || Spacewatch || V || align=right | 1.0 km || 
|-id=851 bgcolor=#fefefe
| 339851 ||  || — || October 1, 2005 || Kitt Peak || Spacewatch || — || align=right | 1.1 km || 
|-id=852 bgcolor=#fefefe
| 339852 ||  || — || October 3, 2005 || Kitt Peak || Spacewatch || — || align=right data-sort-value="0.98" | 980 m || 
|-id=853 bgcolor=#fefefe
| 339853 ||  || — || October 1, 2005 || Catalina || CSS || — || align=right data-sort-value="0.93" | 930 m || 
|-id=854 bgcolor=#fefefe
| 339854 ||  || — || October 3, 2005 || Catalina || CSS || — || align=right data-sort-value="0.97" | 970 m || 
|-id=855 bgcolor=#fefefe
| 339855 Kedainiai ||  ||  || October 7, 2005 || Moletai || K. Černis, J. Zdanavičius || — || align=right | 1.5 km || 
|-id=856 bgcolor=#fefefe
| 339856 ||  || — || October 6, 2005 || Catalina || CSS || — || align=right data-sort-value="0.78" | 780 m || 
|-id=857 bgcolor=#fefefe
| 339857 ||  || — || October 1, 2005 || Kitt Peak || Spacewatch || NYS || align=right data-sort-value="0.84" | 840 m || 
|-id=858 bgcolor=#fefefe
| 339858 ||  || — || October 4, 2005 || Mount Lemmon || Mount Lemmon Survey || V || align=right | 1.8 km || 
|-id=859 bgcolor=#fefefe
| 339859 ||  || — || October 4, 2005 || Mount Lemmon || Mount Lemmon Survey || — || align=right | 1.4 km || 
|-id=860 bgcolor=#fefefe
| 339860 ||  || — || October 2, 2005 || Palomar || NEAT || — || align=right data-sort-value="0.78" | 780 m || 
|-id=861 bgcolor=#fefefe
| 339861 ||  || — || October 5, 2005 || Kitt Peak || Spacewatch || FLO || align=right data-sort-value="0.74" | 740 m || 
|-id=862 bgcolor=#fefefe
| 339862 ||  || — || October 6, 2005 || Mount Lemmon || Mount Lemmon Survey || V || align=right data-sort-value="0.76" | 760 m || 
|-id=863 bgcolor=#fefefe
| 339863 ||  || — || October 7, 2005 || Anderson Mesa || LONEOS || — || align=right data-sort-value="0.99" | 990 m || 
|-id=864 bgcolor=#fefefe
| 339864 ||  || — || October 3, 2005 || Kitt Peak || Spacewatch || V || align=right data-sort-value="0.81" | 810 m || 
|-id=865 bgcolor=#fefefe
| 339865 ||  || — || October 6, 2005 || Anderson Mesa || LONEOS || NYS || align=right data-sort-value="0.77" | 770 m || 
|-id=866 bgcolor=#fefefe
| 339866 ||  || — || September 29, 2005 || Kitt Peak || Spacewatch || NYS || align=right data-sort-value="0.69" | 690 m || 
|-id=867 bgcolor=#fefefe
| 339867 ||  || — || October 6, 2005 || Kitt Peak || Spacewatch || MAS || align=right data-sort-value="0.69" | 690 m || 
|-id=868 bgcolor=#fefefe
| 339868 ||  || — || October 6, 2005 || Anderson Mesa || LONEOS || PHO || align=right | 3.4 km || 
|-id=869 bgcolor=#fefefe
| 339869 ||  || — || October 7, 2005 || Socorro || LINEAR || — || align=right data-sort-value="0.90" | 900 m || 
|-id=870 bgcolor=#fefefe
| 339870 ||  || — || October 7, 2005 || Kitt Peak || Spacewatch || — || align=right data-sort-value="0.94" | 940 m || 
|-id=871 bgcolor=#fefefe
| 339871 ||  || — || October 7, 2005 || Catalina || CSS || FLO || align=right data-sort-value="0.67" | 670 m || 
|-id=872 bgcolor=#fefefe
| 339872 ||  || — || October 7, 2005 || Mount Lemmon || Mount Lemmon Survey || — || align=right data-sort-value="0.85" | 850 m || 
|-id=873 bgcolor=#fefefe
| 339873 ||  || — || September 30, 2005 || Catalina || CSS || — || align=right data-sort-value="0.84" | 840 m || 
|-id=874 bgcolor=#fefefe
| 339874 ||  || — || October 4, 2005 || Mount Lemmon || Mount Lemmon Survey || EUT || align=right data-sort-value="0.68" | 680 m || 
|-id=875 bgcolor=#fefefe
| 339875 ||  || — || October 4, 2005 || Mount Lemmon || Mount Lemmon Survey || ERI || align=right | 1.7 km || 
|-id=876 bgcolor=#fefefe
| 339876 ||  || — || October 7, 2005 || Kitt Peak || Spacewatch || — || align=right | 1.6 km || 
|-id=877 bgcolor=#fefefe
| 339877 ||  || — || October 7, 2005 || Kitt Peak || Spacewatch || — || align=right data-sort-value="0.89" | 890 m || 
|-id=878 bgcolor=#fefefe
| 339878 ||  || — || October 7, 2005 || Catalina || CSS || V || align=right data-sort-value="0.75" | 750 m || 
|-id=879 bgcolor=#fefefe
| 339879 ||  || — || October 7, 2005 || Kitt Peak || Spacewatch || FLO || align=right data-sort-value="0.58" | 580 m || 
|-id=880 bgcolor=#fefefe
| 339880 ||  || — || October 16, 1998 || Kitt Peak || Spacewatch || NYS || align=right data-sort-value="0.48" | 480 m || 
|-id=881 bgcolor=#fefefe
| 339881 ||  || — || October 7, 2005 || Kitt Peak || Spacewatch || — || align=right data-sort-value="0.68" | 680 m || 
|-id=882 bgcolor=#fefefe
| 339882 ||  || — || October 7, 2005 || Kitt Peak || Spacewatch || EUT || align=right data-sort-value="0.65" | 650 m || 
|-id=883 bgcolor=#fefefe
| 339883 ||  || — || October 7, 2005 || Kitt Peak || Spacewatch || NYS || align=right data-sort-value="0.82" | 820 m || 
|-id=884 bgcolor=#fefefe
| 339884 ||  || — || October 7, 2005 || Kitt Peak || Spacewatch || — || align=right data-sort-value="0.88" | 880 m || 
|-id=885 bgcolor=#d6d6d6
| 339885 ||  || — || October 7, 2005 || Kitt Peak || Spacewatch || SHU3:2 || align=right | 7.6 km || 
|-id=886 bgcolor=#fefefe
| 339886 ||  || — || September 25, 2005 || Kitt Peak || Spacewatch || NYS || align=right data-sort-value="0.67" | 670 m || 
|-id=887 bgcolor=#fefefe
| 339887 ||  || — || October 10, 2005 || Kitt Peak || Spacewatch || — || align=right | 1.1 km || 
|-id=888 bgcolor=#fefefe
| 339888 ||  || — || October 6, 2005 || Kitt Peak || Spacewatch || — || align=right data-sort-value="0.87" | 870 m || 
|-id=889 bgcolor=#fefefe
| 339889 ||  || — || October 6, 2005 || Kitt Peak || Spacewatch || — || align=right data-sort-value="0.98" | 980 m || 
|-id=890 bgcolor=#fefefe
| 339890 ||  || — || October 8, 2005 || Kitt Peak || Spacewatch || — || align=right | 2.2 km || 
|-id=891 bgcolor=#fefefe
| 339891 ||  || — || October 8, 2005 || Kitt Peak || Spacewatch || V || align=right data-sort-value="0.62" | 620 m || 
|-id=892 bgcolor=#fefefe
| 339892 ||  || — || October 10, 2005 || Kitt Peak || Spacewatch || NYS || align=right data-sort-value="0.72" | 720 m || 
|-id=893 bgcolor=#fefefe
| 339893 ||  || — || October 9, 2005 || Kitt Peak || Spacewatch || — || align=right data-sort-value="0.69" | 690 m || 
|-id=894 bgcolor=#fefefe
| 339894 ||  || — || October 9, 2005 || Kitt Peak || Spacewatch || — || align=right data-sort-value="0.88" | 880 m || 
|-id=895 bgcolor=#fefefe
| 339895 ||  || — || October 9, 2005 || Kitt Peak || Spacewatch || — || align=right data-sort-value="0.68" | 680 m || 
|-id=896 bgcolor=#fefefe
| 339896 ||  || — || October 9, 2005 || Kitt Peak || Spacewatch || NYS || align=right data-sort-value="0.69" | 690 m || 
|-id=897 bgcolor=#fefefe
| 339897 ||  || — || October 13, 2005 || Socorro || LINEAR || — || align=right | 1.0 km || 
|-id=898 bgcolor=#fefefe
| 339898 ||  || — || September 23, 2005 || Kitt Peak || Spacewatch || ERI || align=right | 1.3 km || 
|-id=899 bgcolor=#fefefe
| 339899 ||  || — || October 1, 2005 || Catalina || CSS || V || align=right data-sort-value="0.76" | 760 m || 
|-id=900 bgcolor=#fefefe
| 339900 ||  || — || October 9, 2005 || Catalina || CSS || V || align=right data-sort-value="0.85" | 850 m || 
|}

339901–340000 

|-bgcolor=#fefefe
| 339901 ||  || — || October 5, 2005 || Kitt Peak || Spacewatch || FLO || align=right data-sort-value="0.66" | 660 m || 
|-id=902 bgcolor=#fefefe
| 339902 ||  || — || September 29, 2005 || Kitt Peak || Spacewatch || — || align=right data-sort-value="0.75" | 750 m || 
|-id=903 bgcolor=#fefefe
| 339903 ||  || — || October 27, 2005 || Mount Graham || W. H. Ryan || — || align=right | 1.7 km || 
|-id=904 bgcolor=#fefefe
| 339904 ||  || — || October 22, 2005 || Kitt Peak || Spacewatch || FLO || align=right data-sort-value="0.79" | 790 m || 
|-id=905 bgcolor=#fefefe
| 339905 ||  || — || October 22, 2005 || Kitt Peak || Spacewatch || NYS || align=right data-sort-value="0.76" | 760 m || 
|-id=906 bgcolor=#fefefe
| 339906 ||  || — || October 22, 2005 || Kitt Peak || Spacewatch || V || align=right data-sort-value="0.73" | 730 m || 
|-id=907 bgcolor=#fefefe
| 339907 ||  || — || October 22, 2005 || Catalina || CSS || V || align=right data-sort-value="0.88" | 880 m || 
|-id=908 bgcolor=#fefefe
| 339908 ||  || — || October 22, 2005 || Catalina || CSS || — || align=right | 1.1 km || 
|-id=909 bgcolor=#fefefe
| 339909 ||  || — || October 23, 2005 || Kitt Peak || Spacewatch || — || align=right data-sort-value="0.95" | 950 m || 
|-id=910 bgcolor=#fefefe
| 339910 ||  || — || October 23, 2005 || Catalina || CSS || NYS || align=right data-sort-value="0.73" | 730 m || 
|-id=911 bgcolor=#fefefe
| 339911 ||  || — || October 24, 2005 || Kitt Peak || Spacewatch || — || align=right data-sort-value="0.83" | 830 m || 
|-id=912 bgcolor=#fefefe
| 339912 ||  || — || October 24, 2005 || Kitt Peak || Spacewatch || — || align=right data-sort-value="0.99" | 990 m || 
|-id=913 bgcolor=#fefefe
| 339913 ||  || — || October 24, 2005 || Kitt Peak || Spacewatch || FLO || align=right data-sort-value="0.73" | 730 m || 
|-id=914 bgcolor=#fefefe
| 339914 ||  || — || October 24, 2005 || Kitt Peak || Spacewatch || NYS || align=right data-sort-value="0.66" | 660 m || 
|-id=915 bgcolor=#fefefe
| 339915 ||  || — || October 24, 2005 || Kitt Peak || Spacewatch || — || align=right data-sort-value="0.90" | 900 m || 
|-id=916 bgcolor=#fefefe
| 339916 ||  || — || October 24, 2005 || Kitt Peak || Spacewatch || — || align=right | 1.1 km || 
|-id=917 bgcolor=#fefefe
| 339917 ||  || — || October 21, 2005 || Palomar || NEAT || V || align=right data-sort-value="0.74" | 740 m || 
|-id=918 bgcolor=#fefefe
| 339918 ||  || — || October 22, 2005 || Kitt Peak || Spacewatch || NYS || align=right data-sort-value="0.78" | 780 m || 
|-id=919 bgcolor=#fefefe
| 339919 ||  || — || October 22, 2005 || Kitt Peak || Spacewatch || — || align=right data-sort-value="0.80" | 800 m || 
|-id=920 bgcolor=#fefefe
| 339920 ||  || — || October 22, 2005 || Catalina || CSS || — || align=right | 1.3 km || 
|-id=921 bgcolor=#fefefe
| 339921 ||  || — || October 22, 2005 || Catalina || CSS || — || align=right data-sort-value="0.90" | 900 m || 
|-id=922 bgcolor=#fefefe
| 339922 ||  || — || October 22, 2005 || Kitt Peak || Spacewatch || NYS || align=right data-sort-value="0.58" | 580 m || 
|-id=923 bgcolor=#fefefe
| 339923 ||  || — || October 22, 2005 || Catalina || CSS || — || align=right data-sort-value="0.88" | 880 m || 
|-id=924 bgcolor=#fefefe
| 339924 ||  || — || October 23, 2005 || Catalina || CSS || V || align=right data-sort-value="0.70" | 700 m || 
|-id=925 bgcolor=#fefefe
| 339925 ||  || — || October 23, 2005 || Catalina || CSS || — || align=right | 1.3 km || 
|-id=926 bgcolor=#fefefe
| 339926 ||  || — || October 23, 2005 || Palomar || NEAT || V || align=right data-sort-value="0.99" | 990 m || 
|-id=927 bgcolor=#fefefe
| 339927 ||  || — || October 23, 2005 || Catalina || CSS || NYS || align=right data-sort-value="0.77" | 770 m || 
|-id=928 bgcolor=#fefefe
| 339928 ||  || — || October 23, 2005 || Catalina || CSS || — || align=right | 2.0 km || 
|-id=929 bgcolor=#fefefe
| 339929 ||  || — || October 23, 2005 || Catalina || CSS || V || align=right | 1.0 km || 
|-id=930 bgcolor=#fefefe
| 339930 ||  || — || October 23, 2005 || Catalina || CSS || — || align=right data-sort-value="0.80" | 800 m || 
|-id=931 bgcolor=#fefefe
| 339931 ||  || — || October 25, 2005 || Mount Lemmon || Mount Lemmon Survey || FLO || align=right data-sort-value="0.73" | 730 m || 
|-id=932 bgcolor=#fefefe
| 339932 ||  || — || October 25, 2005 || Mount Lemmon || Mount Lemmon Survey || MAS || align=right data-sort-value="0.81" | 810 m || 
|-id=933 bgcolor=#fefefe
| 339933 ||  || — || October 22, 2005 || Kitt Peak || Spacewatch || V || align=right data-sort-value="0.76" | 760 m || 
|-id=934 bgcolor=#fefefe
| 339934 ||  || — || October 22, 2005 || Palomar || NEAT || — || align=right data-sort-value="0.93" | 930 m || 
|-id=935 bgcolor=#fefefe
| 339935 ||  || — || October 23, 2005 || Catalina || CSS || V || align=right data-sort-value="0.71" | 710 m || 
|-id=936 bgcolor=#fefefe
| 339936 ||  || — || October 22, 2005 || Kitt Peak || Spacewatch || — || align=right data-sort-value="0.70" | 700 m || 
|-id=937 bgcolor=#fefefe
| 339937 ||  || — || October 22, 2005 || Kitt Peak || Spacewatch || NYS || align=right data-sort-value="0.58" | 580 m || 
|-id=938 bgcolor=#fefefe
| 339938 ||  || — || October 22, 2005 || Kitt Peak || Spacewatch || V || align=right data-sort-value="0.82" | 820 m || 
|-id=939 bgcolor=#fefefe
| 339939 ||  || — || October 22, 2005 || Kitt Peak || Spacewatch || — || align=right | 1.3 km || 
|-id=940 bgcolor=#fefefe
| 339940 ||  || — || October 22, 2005 || Kitt Peak || Spacewatch || V || align=right data-sort-value="0.78" | 780 m || 
|-id=941 bgcolor=#fefefe
| 339941 ||  || — || October 22, 2005 || Kitt Peak || Spacewatch || V || align=right data-sort-value="0.68" | 680 m || 
|-id=942 bgcolor=#fefefe
| 339942 ||  || — || October 22, 2005 || Kitt Peak || Spacewatch || — || align=right | 1.0 km || 
|-id=943 bgcolor=#fefefe
| 339943 ||  || — || October 22, 2005 || Kitt Peak || Spacewatch || ERI || align=right | 2.2 km || 
|-id=944 bgcolor=#fefefe
| 339944 ||  || — || October 23, 2005 || Catalina || CSS || — || align=right | 1.2 km || 
|-id=945 bgcolor=#fefefe
| 339945 ||  || — || October 24, 2005 || Kitt Peak || Spacewatch || V || align=right data-sort-value="0.73" | 730 m || 
|-id=946 bgcolor=#fefefe
| 339946 ||  || — || October 24, 2005 || Kitt Peak || Spacewatch || EUT || align=right data-sort-value="0.69" | 690 m || 
|-id=947 bgcolor=#fefefe
| 339947 ||  || — || October 24, 2005 || Kitt Peak || Spacewatch || MAS || align=right data-sort-value="0.67" | 670 m || 
|-id=948 bgcolor=#fefefe
| 339948 ||  || — || October 24, 2005 || Kitt Peak || Spacewatch || — || align=right | 1.1 km || 
|-id=949 bgcolor=#fefefe
| 339949 ||  || — || October 24, 2005 || Kitt Peak || Spacewatch || NYS || align=right data-sort-value="0.76" | 760 m || 
|-id=950 bgcolor=#d6d6d6
| 339950 ||  || — || October 25, 2005 || Mount Lemmon || Mount Lemmon Survey || 3:2 || align=right | 5.5 km || 
|-id=951 bgcolor=#fefefe
| 339951 ||  || — || October 25, 2005 || Catalina || CSS || NYS || align=right data-sort-value="0.86" | 860 m || 
|-id=952 bgcolor=#fefefe
| 339952 ||  || — || October 25, 2005 || Catalina || CSS || — || align=right | 1.1 km || 
|-id=953 bgcolor=#fefefe
| 339953 ||  || — || October 26, 2005 || Kitt Peak || Spacewatch || FLO || align=right data-sort-value="0.76" | 760 m || 
|-id=954 bgcolor=#fefefe
| 339954 ||  || — || October 26, 2005 || Kitt Peak || Spacewatch || FLO || align=right data-sort-value="0.89" | 890 m || 
|-id=955 bgcolor=#fefefe
| 339955 ||  || — || October 25, 2005 || Kitt Peak || Spacewatch || — || align=right data-sort-value="0.92" | 920 m || 
|-id=956 bgcolor=#fefefe
| 339956 ||  || — || October 22, 2005 || Catalina || CSS || — || align=right data-sort-value="0.89" | 890 m || 
|-id=957 bgcolor=#fefefe
| 339957 ||  || — || October 27, 2005 || Anderson Mesa || LONEOS || V || align=right data-sort-value="0.91" | 910 m || 
|-id=958 bgcolor=#fefefe
| 339958 ||  || — || October 23, 2005 || Kitt Peak || Spacewatch || — || align=right | 1.0 km || 
|-id=959 bgcolor=#fefefe
| 339959 ||  || — || October 24, 2005 || Kitt Peak || Spacewatch || — || align=right data-sort-value="0.83" | 830 m || 
|-id=960 bgcolor=#fefefe
| 339960 ||  || — || October 24, 2005 || Kitt Peak || Spacewatch || FLO || align=right data-sort-value="0.74" | 740 m || 
|-id=961 bgcolor=#fefefe
| 339961 ||  || — || October 24, 2005 || Kitt Peak || Spacewatch || — || align=right data-sort-value="0.75" | 750 m || 
|-id=962 bgcolor=#fefefe
| 339962 ||  || — || October 24, 2005 || Kitt Peak || Spacewatch || V || align=right data-sort-value="0.71" | 710 m || 
|-id=963 bgcolor=#fefefe
| 339963 ||  || — || October 24, 2005 || Kitt Peak || Spacewatch || FLO || align=right data-sort-value="0.70" | 700 m || 
|-id=964 bgcolor=#fefefe
| 339964 ||  || — || October 25, 2005 || Mount Lemmon || Mount Lemmon Survey || — || align=right data-sort-value="0.83" | 830 m || 
|-id=965 bgcolor=#fefefe
| 339965 ||  || — || August 30, 2005 || Palomar || NEAT || — || align=right data-sort-value="0.70" | 700 m || 
|-id=966 bgcolor=#fefefe
| 339966 ||  || — || October 27, 2005 || Mount Lemmon || Mount Lemmon Survey || MAS || align=right data-sort-value="0.75" | 750 m || 
|-id=967 bgcolor=#fefefe
| 339967 ||  || — || October 22, 2005 || Kitt Peak || Spacewatch || V || align=right data-sort-value="0.89" | 890 m || 
|-id=968 bgcolor=#fefefe
| 339968 ||  || — || October 25, 2005 || Kitt Peak || Spacewatch || — || align=right | 1.2 km || 
|-id=969 bgcolor=#fefefe
| 339969 ||  || — || October 27, 2005 || Kitt Peak || Spacewatch || — || align=right data-sort-value="0.56" | 560 m || 
|-id=970 bgcolor=#fefefe
| 339970 ||  || — || October 27, 2005 || Mount Lemmon || Mount Lemmon Survey || — || align=right data-sort-value="0.85" | 850 m || 
|-id=971 bgcolor=#fefefe
| 339971 ||  || — || October 24, 2005 || Palomar || NEAT || — || align=right | 1.0 km || 
|-id=972 bgcolor=#fefefe
| 339972 ||  || — || October 27, 2005 || Palomar || NEAT || — || align=right data-sort-value="0.90" | 900 m || 
|-id=973 bgcolor=#fefefe
| 339973 ||  || — || October 27, 2005 || Socorro || LINEAR || — || align=right | 1.2 km || 
|-id=974 bgcolor=#fefefe
| 339974 ||  || — || October 25, 2005 || Kitt Peak || Spacewatch || — || align=right data-sort-value="0.87" | 870 m || 
|-id=975 bgcolor=#fefefe
| 339975 ||  || — || October 25, 2005 || Kitt Peak || Spacewatch || — || align=right data-sort-value="0.90" | 900 m || 
|-id=976 bgcolor=#fefefe
| 339976 ||  || — || October 25, 2005 || Kitt Peak || Spacewatch || — || align=right data-sort-value="0.82" | 820 m || 
|-id=977 bgcolor=#fefefe
| 339977 ||  || — || October 25, 2005 || Kitt Peak || Spacewatch || — || align=right data-sort-value="0.99" | 990 m || 
|-id=978 bgcolor=#fefefe
| 339978 ||  || — || October 25, 2005 || Kitt Peak || Spacewatch || FLO || align=right data-sort-value="0.84" | 840 m || 
|-id=979 bgcolor=#fefefe
| 339979 ||  || — || October 25, 2005 || Kitt Peak || Spacewatch || V || align=right data-sort-value="0.77" | 770 m || 
|-id=980 bgcolor=#fefefe
| 339980 ||  || — || October 25, 2005 || Mount Lemmon || Mount Lemmon Survey || V || align=right data-sort-value="0.70" | 700 m || 
|-id=981 bgcolor=#fefefe
| 339981 ||  || — || October 25, 2005 || Kitt Peak || Spacewatch || — || align=right data-sort-value="0.90" | 900 m || 
|-id=982 bgcolor=#fefefe
| 339982 ||  || — || October 25, 2005 || Kitt Peak || Spacewatch || — || align=right | 1.00 km || 
|-id=983 bgcolor=#fefefe
| 339983 ||  || — || October 25, 2005 || Kitt Peak || Spacewatch || V || align=right data-sort-value="0.70" | 700 m || 
|-id=984 bgcolor=#fefefe
| 339984 ||  || — || October 28, 2005 || Mount Lemmon || Mount Lemmon Survey || — || align=right | 1.8 km || 
|-id=985 bgcolor=#fefefe
| 339985 ||  || — || October 28, 2005 || Mount Lemmon || Mount Lemmon Survey || MAS || align=right data-sort-value="0.81" | 810 m || 
|-id=986 bgcolor=#fefefe
| 339986 ||  || — || October 23, 2005 || Catalina || CSS || — || align=right data-sort-value="0.98" | 980 m || 
|-id=987 bgcolor=#fefefe
| 339987 ||  || — || October 25, 2005 || Mount Lemmon || Mount Lemmon Survey || — || align=right data-sort-value="0.86" | 860 m || 
|-id=988 bgcolor=#fefefe
| 339988 ||  || — || October 25, 2005 || Kitt Peak || Spacewatch || NYS || align=right data-sort-value="0.62" | 620 m || 
|-id=989 bgcolor=#fefefe
| 339989 ||  || — || October 25, 2005 || Kitt Peak || Spacewatch || — || align=right | 1.0 km || 
|-id=990 bgcolor=#fefefe
| 339990 ||  || — || October 26, 2005 || Kitt Peak || Spacewatch || — || align=right data-sort-value="0.76" | 760 m || 
|-id=991 bgcolor=#fefefe
| 339991 ||  || — || October 26, 2005 || Kitt Peak || Spacewatch || — || align=right data-sort-value="0.85" | 850 m || 
|-id=992 bgcolor=#fefefe
| 339992 ||  || — || October 26, 2005 || Kitt Peak || Spacewatch || NYS || align=right data-sort-value="0.62" | 620 m || 
|-id=993 bgcolor=#fefefe
| 339993 ||  || — || October 29, 2005 || Catalina || CSS || — || align=right | 1.1 km || 
|-id=994 bgcolor=#fefefe
| 339994 ||  || — || October 24, 2005 || Kitt Peak || Spacewatch || — || align=right data-sort-value="0.82" | 820 m || 
|-id=995 bgcolor=#fefefe
| 339995 ||  || — || October 24, 2005 || Kitt Peak || Spacewatch || — || align=right data-sort-value="0.84" | 840 m || 
|-id=996 bgcolor=#fefefe
| 339996 ||  || — || October 26, 2005 || Kitt Peak || Spacewatch || — || align=right data-sort-value="0.74" | 740 m || 
|-id=997 bgcolor=#fefefe
| 339997 ||  || — || October 26, 2005 || Kitt Peak || Spacewatch || V || align=right data-sort-value="0.63" | 630 m || 
|-id=998 bgcolor=#fefefe
| 339998 ||  || — || October 26, 2005 || Kitt Peak || Spacewatch || NYS || align=right data-sort-value="0.60" | 600 m || 
|-id=999 bgcolor=#fefefe
| 339999 ||  || — || October 26, 2005 || Kitt Peak || Spacewatch || — || align=right data-sort-value="0.87" | 870 m || 
|-id=000 bgcolor=#fefefe
| 340000 ||  || — || October 26, 2005 || Kitt Peak || Spacewatch || — || align=right data-sort-value="0.69" | 690 m || 
|}

References

External links 
 Discovery Circumstances: Numbered Minor Planets (335001)–(340000) (IAU Minor Planet Center)

0339